This is a list of the native wild mammal species recorded in South America. South America's terrestrial mammals fall into three distinct groups: "old-timers", African immigrants and recent North American immigrants. The marsupials and xenarthrans are "old-timers", their ancestors having been present on the continent since at least the very early Cenozoic Era. During the early Cenozoic, South America's only land connection was to Antarctica, so it was effectively cut off from most of the world; as the fragments of Gondwana continued to separate, this connection was lost, leaving South America an island continent. Caviomorph rodents and monkeys arrived as "waif dispersers" by rafting across the Atlantic from Africa in the Eocene epoch, 35 million or more years ago. All the remaining nonflying mammals of South America are recent arrivals, having migrated from North America via Central America during the past seven million years as part of the Great American Interchange; this invasion, which peaked around three million years ago, was made possible when the formation of the volcanic Isthmus of Panama bridged North and South America. The newcomers out-competed and drove to extinction many mammals that had evolved during South America's long period of isolation, as well as some species from other classes (e.g., terror birds).

South America suffered another major loss of mammal species in the Quaternary extinction event, which started around 12,500 cal BP, at roughly the time of arrival of Paleoindians, and may have lasted up to several thousand years. At least 37 genera of mammals were eliminated, including most of the megafauna. While South America currently has no megaherbivore species weighing more than 1000 kg, prior to this event it had a menagerie of about 25 of them (consisting of gomphotheres, camelids, ground sloths, glyptodonts, and toxodontids – 75% of these being "old-timers"), dwarfing Africa's present and recent total of 6.

Anthropogenic climate change and the damage to its ecosystems resulting from the rapid recent growth of the human population pose a further threat to South America's biodiversity.

The list consists of those species found in the nations or overseas territories of continental South America (including their island possessions, such as the Galápagos), as well as in Trinidad and Tobago and the Falkland Islands; Panama is not included. As of May 2012, the list contains 1,331 species, 340 genera, 62 families and 15 orders. Of the taxa from nonflying, nonmarine groups (992 species, 230 genera, 40 families and 12 orders), "old-timers" comprise 14% of species, 15% of genera, 20% of families and 42% of orders; African immigrants make up 38% of species, 30% of genera, 40% of families and 17% of orders; North American invaders constitute 49% of species 55% of genera, 40% of families and 50% of orders. At the order level, the "old-timers" are overrepresented because of their ancient local origins, while the African immigrants are underrepresented because of their "sweepstakes" mode of dispersal.

Of the species, 9 are extinct, 29 are critically endangered, 64 are endangered, 111 are vulnerable, 64 are near threatened, and 255 are data deficient. Mammal species presumed extinct since AD 1500 (nine or ten cases) are included. Domestic species (e.g., the guinea pig, alpaca, and llama) and introduced species are not listed.

Note: This list is inevitably incomplete, since new species are continually being recognized via discovery or reclassification. Places to check for missing species include the list of mammals described in the 2000s, and the species listings in the articles for mammalian genera, especially those of small mammals such as rodents or bats.

The following tags are used to highlight each species' conservation status as assessed by the International Union for Conservation of Nature; those on the left are used here, those in the second column in some other articles:

The IUCN status of all listed species except bats was last updated between March and June 2009; bats were updated in September 2009.

Subclass: Theria

Infraclass: Metatheria
The infraclass Metatheria includes all living and extinct marsupials, but also includes some related extinct orders of mammals that are no longer considered marsupials, such as Sparassodonta. At least six families of sparassodonts lived in South America prior to the interchange, dominating the niches for large mammalian carnivores.

Marsupials are a collection of pouched mammals that was once more widely distributed. Today they are found primarily in isolated or formerly isolated continents of Gondwanan origin. South America's 22 extant genera compares with 10 in Central America, 1 in North America north of Mexico, 52 in Australia, 28 in New Guinea and 2 in Sulawesi. South American marsupials are thought to be ancestral to those of Australasia.

Superorder: Ameridelphia

Order: Didelphimorphia (common opossums) 

Didelphimorphia is the order of common opossums of the Western Hemisphere. Opossums probably diverged from the basic South American marsupials in the late Cretaceous or early Paleocene. They are small to medium-sized marsupials, about the size of a large house cat, with a long snout and prehensile tail.

Family: Didelphidae (American opossums)
Subfamily: Caluromyinae
Genus: Caluromys
 Derby's woolly opossum, C. derbianus LC
 Brown-eared woolly opossum, C. lanatus LC
 Bare-tailed woolly opossum, C. philander LC
Genus: Caluromysiops
 Black-shouldered opossum, Caluromysiops irrupta LC
Subfamily: Glironiinae
Genus: Glironia
 Bushy-tailed opossum, Glironia venusta LC
Subfamily: Hyladelphinae
Genus: Hyladelphys
 Kalinowski's mouse opossum, Hyladelphys kalinowskii LC
Subfamily: Didelphinae
 Genus Chacodelphys
 Chacoan pygmy opossum, Chacodelphys formosa VU
Genus: Chironectes
 Water opossum, Chironectes minimus LC
 Genus Cryptonanus
 Agricola's gracile opossum, Cryptonanus agricolai DD
 Chacoan gracile opossum, Cryptonanus chacoensis LC
 Guahiba gracile opossum, Cryptonanus guahybae DD
 Red-bellied gracile opossum, Cryptonanus ignitus EX
 Unduavi gracile opossum, Cryptonanus unduaviensis DD
Genus: Didelphis
 White-eared opossum, Didelphis albiventris LC
 Big-eared opossum, Didelphis aurita LC
 Guianan white-eared opossum, Didelphis imperfecta LC
 Common opossum, Didelphis marsupialis LC
 Andean white-eared opossum, Didelphis pernigra LC
Genus: Gracilinanus
 Aceramarca gracile opossum, Gracilinanus aceramarcae LC
 Agile gracile opossum, Gracilinanus agilis LC
 Wood sprite gracile opossum, Gracilinanus dryas NT
 Emilia's gracile opossum, Gracilinanus emiliae DD
 Northern gracile opossum, Gracilinanus marica LC
 Brazilian gracile opossum, Gracilinanus microtarsus LC
Genus: Lestodelphys
 Patagonian opossum, Lestodelphys halli LC
Genus: Lutreolina
 Big lutrine opossum, Lutreolina crassicaudata LC
 Massoia's lutrine opossum, Lutreolina massoia LC
Genus: Marmosa
Subgenus: Eomarmosa
 Red mouse opossum, Marmosa rubra DD
Subgenus: Exulomarmosa
 Isthmian mouse opossum, Marmosa isthmica
 Robinson's mouse opossum, Marmosa robinsoni LC
 Marmosa simonsi
 Guajira mouse opossum, Marmosa xerophila VU
 Marmosa zeledoni
Subgenus: Marmosa
 Quechuan mouse opossum, Marmosa macrotarsus LC
 Linnaeus's mouse opossum, Marmosa murina LC
 Tyler's mouse opossum, Marmosa tyleriana DD
 Marmosa waterhousei
Subgenus: Micoureus
 Alston's mouse opossum, Marmosa alstoni LC
 White-bellied woolly mouse opossum, Marmosa constantiae LC
 Woolly mouse opossum, Marmosa demerarae LC
 Tate's woolly mouse opossum, Marmosa paraguayana LC
 Little woolly mouse opossum, Marmosa phaea VU
 Bare-tailed woolly mouse opossum, Marmosa regina LC
Subgenus: Stegomarmosa
 Heavy-browed mouse opossum, Marmosa andersoni DD
 Rufous mouse opossum, Marmosa lepida LC
Genus: Marmosops
 Bishop's slender opossum, Marmosops bishopi LC
 Marmosops caucae
 Narrow-headed slender opossum, Marmosops cracens DD
 Creighton's slender opossum, Marmosops creightoni DD
 Dusky slender opossum, Marmosops fuscatus DD
 Handley's slender opossum, Marmosops handleyi CR
 Tschudi's slender opossum, Marmosops impavidus LC
 Gray slender opossum, Marmosops incanus LC
 Junin slender opossum, Marmosops juninensis VU
 Neblina slender opossum, Marmosops neblina LC
 White-bellied slender opossum, Marmosops noctivagus LC
 Dorothy's slender opossum, Marmosops ocellatus LC
 Delicate slender opossum, Marmosops parvidens LC
 Brazilian slender opossum, Marmosops paulensis LC
 Pinheiro's slender opossum, Marmosops pinheiroi LC
Genus: Metachirus
 Brown four-eyed opossum, Metachirus nudicaudatus LC
Genus: Monodelphis
 Sepia short-tailed opossum, Monodelphis adusta LC
 Northern three-striped opossum, Monodelphis americana LC
 Monodelphis arlindoi
 Northern red-sided opossum, Monodelphis brevicaudata LC
 Yellow-sided opossum, Monodelphis dimidiata LC
 Gray short-tailed opossum, Monodelphis domestica LC
 Emilia's short-tailed opossum, Monodelphis emiliae LC
 Monodelphis gardneri
 Amazonian red-sided opossum, Monodelphis glirina LC
 Monodelphis handleyi 
 Ihering's three-striped opossum, Monodelphis iheringi DD
 Pygmy short-tailed opossum, Monodelphis kunsi LC
 Marajó short-tailed opossum, Monodelphis maraxina DD
 Osgood's short-tailed opossum, Monodelphis osgoodi LC
 Hooded red-sided opossum, Monodelphis palliolata LC
 Monodelphis peruviana 
 Reig's opossum, Monodelphis reigi VU
 Ronald's opossum, Monodelphis ronaldi LC
 Chestnut-striped opossum, Monodelphis rubida DD
 Monodelphis sanctaerosae
 Long-nosed short-tailed opossum, Monodelphis scalops LC
 Southern red-sided opossum, Monodelphis sorex LC
 Southern three-striped opossum, Monodelphis theresa DD
 Monodelphis touan
 Red three-striped opossum, Monodelphis umbristriata VU
 One-striped opossum, Monodelphis unistriata DD
Genus: Philander
 Anderson's four-eyed opossum, Philander andersoni LC
 Deltaic four-eyed opossum, Philander deltae LC
 Southeastern four-eyed opossum, Philander frenata LC
 McIlhenny's four-eyed opossum, Philander mcilhennyi LC
 Mondolfi's four-eyed opossum, Philander mondolfii LC
 Olrog's four-eyed opossum, Philander olrogi
 Gray four-eyed opossum, Philander opossum LC
Genus: Thylamys
 Cinderella fat-tailed mouse opossum, Thylamys cinderella LC
 Thylamys citellus
 Elegant fat-tailed mouse opossum, Thylamys elegans LC
 Karimi's fat-tailed mouse opossum, Thylamys karimii VU
 Paraguayan fat-tailed mouse opossum, Thylamys macrura NT
 White-bellied fat-tailed mouse opossum, Thylamys pallidior LC
 Thylamys pulchellus
 Common fat-tailed mouse opossum, Thylamys pusillus LC
 Argentine fat-tailed mouse opossum, Thylamys sponsorius LC
 Tate's fat-tailed mouse opossum, Thylamys tatei DD
 Dwarf fat-tailed mouse opossum, Thylamys velutinus LC
 Buff-bellied fat-tailed mouse opossum, Thylamys venustus DD

Order: Paucituberculata (shrew opossums)

There are six extant species of shrew opossum. They are small shrew-like marsupials confined to the Andes.

Family: Caenolestidae
Genus: Caenolestes
 Gray-bellied caenolestid, Caenolestes caniventer NT
 Andean caenolestid, Caenolestes condorensis VU
 Northern caenolestid, Caenolestes convelatus VU
 Dusky caenolestid, Caenolestes fuliginosus LC
 Eastern caenolestid, Caenolestes sangay VU
Genus: Lestoros
 Incan caenolestid, Lestoros inca LC
Genus: Rhyncholestes
 Long-nosed caenolestid, Rhyncholestes raphanurus NT

Superorder: Australidelphia

Order: Microbiotheria (monito del monte) 

The monito del monte of Chile and Argentina is the only extant member of its family and the only surviving member of an ancient order, Microbiotheria. It appears to be more closely related to Australian marsupials than to other Neotropic marsupials; this is a reflection of the South American origin of all Australasian marsupials.

Family: Microbiotheriidae
Genus: Dromiciops
 Monito del monte, Dromiciops gliroides NT

Infraclass: Eutheria

Superorder: Afrotheria

Order: Sirenia (manatees and dugongs)

Sirenia is an order of fully aquatic, herbivorous mammals that inhabit rivers, estuaries, coastal marine waters, swamps, and marine wetlands. All four species are endangered. They evolved about 50 million years ago, and their closest living relatives are elephants. The manatees are the only extant afrotherians in the Americas. However, a number proboscid species, some of which survived until the arrival of Paleoindians, once inhabited the region. Those that reached South America have usually been classified as gomphotheres, but sometimes instead as elephantids.

Family: Trichechidae
Genus: Trichechus
 Amazonian manatee, T. inunguis  
 West Indian manatee, T. manatus

Superorder: Xenarthra

Order: Cingulata (armadillos)

The armadillos are small mammals with a bony armored shell. All 21 extant species are found in South America, where they originated. Their much larger relatives, the pampatheres and glyptodonts, once lived in North and South America but became extinct following the appearance of humans.

Family: Dasypodidae (long-nosed armadillos)
Subfamily: Dasypodinae
Genus: Dasypus
 Southern long-nosed armadillo, Dasypus hybridus NT
 Greater long-nosed armadillo, Dasypus kappleri LC
 Nine-banded armadillo, Dasypus novemcinctus LC
 Hairy long-nosed armadillo, Dasypus pilosus VU
 Llanos long-nosed armadillo, Dasypus sabanicola LC
 Seven-banded armadillo, Dasypus septemcinctus LC
 Yepes's mulita, Dasypus yepesi DD
Family: Chlamyphoridae (armadillos)
Subfamily Chlamyphorinae
Genus: Calyptophractus
 Greater fairy armadillo, Calyptophractus retusus DD
Genus: Chlamyphorus
 Pink fairy armadillo, Chlamyphorus truncatus DD
Subfamily: Euphractinae
Genus: Chaetophractus
 Andean hairy armadillo, Chaetophractus nationi VU
 Screaming hairy armadillo, Chaetophractus vellerosus LC
 Big hairy armadillo, Chaetophractus villosus LC
Genus: Euphractus
 Six-banded armadillo, Euphractus sexcinctus LC
Genus: Zaedyus
 Pichi, Zaedyus pichiy NT
Subfamily: Tolypeutinae
Genus: Cabassous
 Northern naked-tailed armadillo, Cabassous centralis DD
 Chacoan naked-tailed armadillo, Cabassous chacoensis NT
 Greater naked-tailed armadillo, Cabassous tatouay LC
 Southern naked-tailed armadillo, Cabassous unicinctus LC
Genus: Priodontes
 Giant armadillo, Priodontes maximus VU
Genus: Tolypeutes
 Southern three-banded armadillo, Tolypeutes matacus NT
 Brazilian three-banded armadillo, Tolypeutes tricinctus VU

Order: Pilosa (sloths and anteaters)

The order Pilosa is confined to the Americas and contains the tree sloths and anteaters (which include the tamanduas). All 5 extant genera and 9 of 10 extant species are present in South America, the ancestral home of the group. (The exception is the pygmy three-toed sloth, endemic to an island off Panama.) Numerous ground sloths, some of which reached the size of elephants, were once present in both North and South America, as well as on the Antilles. (Some west coastal South American forms had even evolved into marine sloths.) All of these went extinct following the arrival of humans. Extant tree sloths fall into two groups that are not closely related, and which do not form a clade; two-toed sloths are much more closely related to some extinct ground sloths than to three-toed sloths.

Suborder: Folivora
Family: Bradypodidae (three-toed sloths)
Genus: Bradypus
 Maned sloth, Bradypus torquatus VU
 Pale-throated sloth, Bradypus tridactylus LC
 Brown-throated sloth, Bradypus variegatus LC
Family: Choloepodidae (two-toed sloths)
Genus: Choloepus
 Linnaeus's two-toed sloth, Choloepus didactylus LC
 Hoffmann's two-toed sloth, Choloepus hoffmanni LC
Suborder: Vermilingua
Family: Cyclopedidae
Genus: Cyclopes (silky anteaters)
 Cyclopes catellus NE
 Cyclopes didactylus LC
 Cyclopes dorsalis NE
 Cyclopes ida NE
 Cyclopes rufus NE
 Cyclopes thomasi NE
 Cyclopes xinguensis NE
Family: Myrmecophagidae (American anteaters)
Genus: Myrmecophaga
 Giant anteater, Myrmecophaga tridactyla VU
Genus: Tamandua
 Northern tamandua, Tamandua mexicana LC
 Southern tamandua, Tamandua tetradactyla LC

Superorder: Euarchontoglires

Order: Primates

The order Primates includes the lemurs, monkeys, and apes, with the latter category including humans. It is divided into four main groupings: strepsirrhines, tarsiers, monkeys of the New World (parvorder Platyrrhini), and monkeys and apes of the Old World. South America's 20 genera of nonhuman primates compares with 6 in Central America, 15 in Madagascar, 23 in Africa and 19 in Asia. All South American monkeys are believed to be descended from ancestors that rafted over from Africa about 25 million years ago in a single dispersal event.

Suborder: Haplorrhini
Infraorder: Simiiformes
Parvorder: Platyrrhini (New World monkeys)
Family: Aotidae (night monkeys)
Genus: Aotus
 Azara's night monkey, Aotus azarae LC
 Brumback's night monkey, Aotus brumbacki VU
 Gray-handed night monkey, Aotus griseimembra VU
 Hernández-Camacho's night monkey, Aotus jorgehernandezi DD
 Gray-bellied night monkey, Aotus lemurinus VU
 Peruvian night monkey, Aotus miconax VU
 Nancy Ma's night monkey, Aotus nancymaae LC
 Black-headed night monkey, Aotus nigriceps LC
 Three-striped night monkey, Aotus trivirgatus LC
 Spix's night monkey, Aotus vociferans LC
 Panamanian night monkey, Aotus zonalis DD
Family: Callitrichidae
Genus: Callibella
 Roosmalens' dwarf marmoset, Callibella humilis VU
Genus: Cebuella
 Pygmy marmoset, Cebuella pygmaea LC
Genus: Callithrix
 Buffy-tufted marmoset, Callithrix aurita VU
 Buffy-headed marmoset, Callithrix flaviceps EN
 White-headed marmoset, Callithrix geoffroyi LC
 Common marmoset, Callithrix jacchus LC
 Wied's marmoset, Callithrix kuhlii NT
 Black-tufted marmoset, Callithrix penicillata LC
Genus: Mico
 Rio Acari marmoset, Mico acariensis DD
 Silvery marmoset, Mico argentatus LC
 Gold-and-white marmoset, Mico chrysoleucus DD
 Emilia's marmoset, Mico emiliae DD
 Santarem marmoset, Mico humeralifer DD
 Hershkovitz's marmoset, Mico intermedius LC
 White marmoset, Mico leucippe VU
 Manicore marmoset, Mico manicorensis LC
 Marca's marmoset, Mico marcai DD
 Maués marmoset, Mico mauesi LC
 Black-tailed marmoset, Mico melanurus LC
 Black-headed marmoset, Mico nigriceps DD
 Rondon's marmoset, Mico rondoni VU
 Satéré marmoset, Mico saterei LC
Genus: Callimico
 Goeldi's marmoset, Callimico goeldii VU
Genus: Leontopithecus
 Superagui lion tamarin, Leontopithecus caissara CR
 Golden-headed lion tamarin, Leontopithecus chrysomelas EN
 Black lion tamarin, Leontopithecus chrysopygus EN
 Golden lion tamarin, Leontopithecus rosalia EN
Genus: Saguinus
 Pied tamarin, Saguinus bicolor EN
 Brown-mantled tamarin, Saguinus fuscicollis LC
 Geoffroy's tamarin, Saguinus geoffroyi LC
 Graells's tamarin, Saguinus graellsi NT
 Emperor tamarin, Saguinus imperator LC
 Mottle-faced tamarin, Saguinus inustus LC
 White-lipped tamarin, Saguinus labiatus LC
 White-footed tamarin, Saguinus leucopus EN
 Martins's tamarin, Saguinus martinsi LC
 White-mantled tamarin, Saguinus melanoleucus LC
 Red-handed tamarin, Saguinus midas LC
 Moustached tamarin, Saguinus mystax LC
 Black tamarin, Saguinus niger VU
 Black-mantled tamarin, Saguinus nigricollis LC
 Cottontop tamarin, Saguinus oedipus CR
 Red-capped tamarin, Saguinus pileatus LC
 Golden-mantled tamarin, Saguinus tripartitus NT
Family: Cebidae
Subfamily: Cebinae
Genus: Cebus
 Ecuadorian capuchin, Cebus aequatorialis CR
 White-fronted capuchin, Cebus albifrons LC
 Brown weeper capuchin, Cebus brunneus LC
 Colombian white-headed capuchin, Cebus capucinus LC
 Río Cesar white-fronted capuchin, Cebus cesarae DD
 Shock-headed capuchin, Cebus cuscinus NT
 Kaapori capuchin, Cebus kaapori CR
 Sierra de Perijá white-fronted capuchin, Cebus leucocephalus NE
 Santa Marta white-fronted capuchin, Cebus malitiosus EN
 Wedge-capped capuchin, Cebus olivaceus LC
 Spix's white-fronted capuchin, Cebus unicolor NE
 Varied white-fronted capuchin, Cebus versicolor EN
 Marañón white-fronted capuchin, Cebus yuracus NE
Genus: Sapajus
 Tufted capuchin, Sapajus apella LC
 Azaras's capuchin, Sapajus cay LC
 Blond capuchin, Sapajus flavius CR
 Black-striped capuchin, Sapajus libidinosus LC
 Large-headed capuchin, Sapajus macrocephalus LC
 Black capuchin, Sapajus nigritus NT
 Crested capuchin, Sapajus robustus EN
 Golden-bellied capuchin, Sapajus xanthosternos CR
Subfamily: Saimiriinae
Genus: Saimiri
 Black-capped squirrel monkey, Saimiri boliviensis LC
 Humboldt's squirrel monkey, Saimiri cassiquiarensis
 Collins' squirrel monkey, Saimiri collinsii
 Guianan squirrel monkey, Saimiri sciureus LC
 Bare-eared squirrel monkey, Saimiri ustus NT
 Black squirrel monkey, Saimiri vanzolinii VU
Family: Atelidae
Subfamily: Alouattinae
Genus: Alouatta
 Ursine howler, Alouatta arctoidea LC
 Red-handed howler, Alouatta belzebul VU
 Black howler, Alouatta caraya LC
 Spix's red-handed howler, Alouatta discolor VU
 Brown howler, Alouatta guariba LC
 Juruá red howler, Alouatta juara LC
 Guyanan red howler, Alouatta macconnelli LC
 Amazon black howler, Alouatta nigerrima LC
 Mantled howler, Alouatta palliata LC
 Purus red howler, Alouatta puruensis LC
 Bolivian red howler, Alouatta sara LC
 Venezuelan red howler, Alouatta seniculus LC
 Maranhão red-handed howler, Alouatta ululata EN
Subfamily: Atelinae
Genus: Ateles
 White-fronted spider monkey, Ateles belzebuth EN
 Peruvian spider monkey, Ateles chamek EN
 Black-headed spider monkey, Ateles fusciceps CR
 Geoffroy's spider monkey, Ateles geoffroyi EN
 Brown spider monkey, Ateles hybridus CR
 White-cheeked spider monkey, Ateles marginatus EN
 Red-faced spider monkey, Ateles paniscus VU
Genus: Brachyteles
 Southern muriqui, Brachyteles arachnoides EN
 Northern muriqui, Brachyteles hypoxanthus CR
Genus: Lagothrix
 Gray woolly monkey, Lagothrix cana EN
 Brown woolly monkey, Lagothrix lagothricha VU
 Colombian woolly monkey, Lagothrix lugens CR
 Silvery woolly monkey, Lagothrix poeppigii VU
Genus: Oreonax
 Yellow-tailed woolly monkey, Oreonax flavicauda CR
Family: Pitheciidae
Subfamily: Callicebinae
Genus: Cheracebus
 Lucifer titi, Cheracebus lucifer LC
 Black titi, Cheracebus lugens LC
 Colombian black-handed titi, Cheracebus medemi VU
 Rio Purus titi, Cheracebus purinus LC
 Red-headed titi, Cheracebus regulus LC
 Collared titi, Cheracebus torquatus LC
Genus: Callicebus
 Barbara Brown's titi, Plecturocebus barbarabrownae CR
 Coimbra Filho's titi, Callicebus coimbrai EN
 Coastal black-handed titi, Callicebus melanochir VU
 Black-fronted titi, Callicebus nigrifrons NT
 Atlantic titi, Callicebus personatus VU
Genus: Plecturocebus
 Madidi titi, Plecturocebus aureipalatii LC
 Baptista Lake titi, Plecturocebus baptista LC
 Prince Bernhard's titi, Plecturocebus bernhardi LC
 Brown titi, Plecturocebus brunneus LC
 Chestnut-bellied titi, Plecturocebus caligatus LC
 Caquetá titi, Plecturocebus caquetensis CR
 Ashy black titi, Plecturocebus cinerascens LC
 Coppery titi, Plecturocebus cupreus LC
 White-tailed titi, Plecturocebus discolor LC
 White-eared titi, Plecturocebus donacophilus LC
 Hershkovitz's titi, Plecturocebus dubius LC
 Alta Floresta titi, Plecturocebus groves
 Hoffmanns's titi, Plecturocebus hoffmannsi LC
 Milton's titi, Plecturocebus miltoni NE
 Rio Beni titi, Plecturocebus modestus EN
 Red-bellied titi, Plecturocebus moloch LC
 Rio Mayo titi, Plecturocebus oenanthe EN
 Ollala brothers' titi, Plecturocebus olallae EN
 Ornate titi, Plecturocebus ornatus VU
 White-coated titi, Plecturocebus pallescens LC
 Stephen Nash's titi, Plecturocebus stephennashi DD
 Urubamba brown titi, Plecturocebus urubambensis NE
 Vieira's titi, Plecturocebus vieirai NE
Subfamily: Pitheciinae
Genus: Pithecia
 Equatorial saki, Pithecia aequatorialis LC
 White-footed saki, Pithecia albicans VU
 Cazuza's saki, Pithecia cazuzai NE
 Golden-faced saki, Pithecia chrysocephala LC
 Hairy saki, Pithecia hirsuta NE
 Burnished saki, Pithecia inusta NE
 Rio Tapajós saki, Pithecia irrorata NE
 Isabel's saki, Pithecia isabela NE
 Monk saki, Pithecia monachus NE
 Miller's saki, Pithecia milleri DD
 Mittermeier's Tapajós saki, Pithecia mittermeieri NE
 Napo saki, Pithecia napensis DD
 White-faced saki, Pithecia pithecia LC
 Pissinatti’s bald-faced saki, Pithecia pissinattii NE
 Rylands' bald-faced saki, Pithecia rylandsi NE
 Vanzolini's bald-faced saki, Pithecia vanzolinii DD
Genus: Chiropotes
 White-nosed saki, Chiropotes albinasus EN
 Red-backed bearded saki, Chiropotes chiropotes LC
 Brown-backed bearded saki, Chiropotes israelita
 Black bearded saki, Chiropotes satanas CR
 Uta Hick's bearded saki, Chiropotes utahicki EN
Genus: Cacajao
 Aracá uakari, Cacajao ayresii VU
 Bald uakari, Cacajao calvus VU
 Neblina uakari, Cacajao hosomi VU
 Golden-backed uakari, Cacajao melanocephalus LC

Order: Rodentia (rodents)

Rodents make up the largest order of mammals, with over 40% of mammalian species. They have two incisors in the upper and lower jaw which grow continually and must be kept short by gnawing. Most rodents are small, although the capybara can weigh up to 45 kg (100 lb). South America's rodent fauna today is largely an outgrowth of two spectacularly fortunate ancient "sweepstakes" dispersal events, each of which was followed by explosive diversification. Caviomorphs, the first rodents to reach the continent, are believed to have washed ashore after rafting across the Atlantic from Africa over 30 million years ago. More recently, ancestral sigmodontine rodents apparently island-hopped from Central America 5 million or more years ago, prior to the formation of the Panamanian land bridge. These two groups now comprise 36% and 60%, respectively, of all South American rodent species. The corresponding figures are 10% and 27% for Central America, 2% and 10% for Mexico, 0.5% and 3% for North America north of Mexico, and 72% and 27% for recent endemic Caribbean rodents. Conversely, sciurids make up 3% of rodents in South America, 8% in Central America, 15% in Mexico and 31% in North America north of Mexico, while castorimorphs are 1%, 16%, 26% and 28%, respectively. Sciurids are absent from South America's southern cone, while castorimorphs are only present in northwest South America (Colombia, Venezuela and Ecuador). Illustrating the advantage of gaining a head start in colonizing a new land mass, sigmodontine rodents comprise 99.5% of all cricetid rodents in South America, but only 42% in Central America, 17% in Mexico and 7% in North America north of Mexico.

Suborder: Hystricomorpha
Parvorder Caviomorpha
Family: Erethizontidae (New World porcupines)
Subfamily: Chaetomyinae
Genus: Chaetomys
 Bristle-spined rat, Chaetomys subspinosus VU
Subfamily: Erethizontinae
Genus: Coendou
 Baturite porcupine, Coendou baturitensis
 Bicolored-spined porcupine, Coendou bicolor LC
 Streaked dwarf porcupine, Coendou ichillus DD
 Bahia porcupine, Coendou insidiosus LC
 Black-tailed hairy dwarf porcupine, Coendou melanurus LC
 Black dwarf porcupine, Coendou nycthemera DD
 Brazilian porcupine, Coendou prehensilis LC
 Frosted hairy dwarf porcupine, Coendou pruinosus LC
 Andean porcupine, Coendou quichua DD
 Roosmalen's dwarf porcupine, Coendou roosmalenorum DD
 Rothschild's porcupine, Coendou rothschildi DD
 Stump-tailed porcupine, Coendou rufescens LC
 Santa Marta porcupine, Coendou sanctamartae DD
 Dwarf porcupine, Coendou speratus EN
 Paraguaian hairy dwarf porcupine, Coendou spinosus LC
 Brown hairy dwarf porcupine, Coendou vestitus DD
Family: Chinchillidae (viscachas and chinchillas)
Genus: Chinchilla
 Short-tailed chinchilla, Chinchilla chinchilla CR
 Long-tailed chinchilla, Chinchilla lanigera CR
Genus: Lagidium
 Lagidium ahuacaense
 Northern viscacha, Lagidium peruanum LC
 Southern viscacha, Lagidium viscacia LC
 Wolffsohn's viscacha, Lagidium wolffsohni DD
Genus: Lagostomus
 Plains viscacha, Lagostomus maximus LC
Family: Dinomyidae (pacarana)
Genus: Dinomys
 Pacarana, Dinomys branickii VU
Family: Caviidae (guinea pigs and cavies)
Subfamily: Caviinae
Genus: Cavia
 Brazilian guinea pig, Cavia aperea LC
 Shiny guinea pig, Cavia fulgida LC
 Santa Catarina's guinea pig, Cavia intermedia CR
 Greater guinea pig, Cavia magna LC
 Montane guinea pig, Cavia tschudii LC
Genus: Galea
 Southern highland yellow-toothed cavy, Galea comes DD
 Brazilian yellow-toothed cavy, Galea flavidens LC
 Lowland yellow-toothed cavy, Galea leucoblephara LC
 Common yellow-toothed cavy, Galea musteloides LC
 Muenster yellow-toothed cavy, Galea m. monasteriensis NE
 Spix's yellow-toothed cavy, Galea spixii LC
Genus: Microcavia
 Southern mountain cavy, Microcavia australis LC
 Andean mountain cavy, Microcavia niata LC
 Shipton's mountain cavy, Microcavia shiptoni NT
Subfamily: Dolichotinae
Genus: Dolichotis
 Patagonian mara, Dolichotis patagonum NT
 Chacoan mara, Dolichotis salinicola LC
Subfamily: Hydrochoerinae (capybaras and rock cavies)
Genus: Hydrochoerus
 Capybara, Hydrochoerus hydrochaeris LC
 Lesser capybara, Hydrochoerus isthmius DD
Genus: Kerodon
 Acrobatic cavy, Kerodon acrobata DD
 Rock cavy, Kerodon rupestris LC
Family: Dasyproctidae (agoutis and acouchis)
Genus: Dasyprocta
 Azara's agouti, Dasyprocta azarae DD
 Crested agouti, Dasyprocta cristata DD
 Black agouti, Dasyprocta fuliginosa LC
 Orinoco agouti, Dasyprocta guamara NT
 Kalinowski's agouti, Dasyprocta kalinowskii DD
 Red-rumped agouti, Dasyprocta leporina LC
 Black-rumped agouti, Dasyprocta prymnolopha LC
 Central American agouti, Dasyprocta punctata LC
Genus: Myoprocta
 Red acouchi, Myoprocta acouchy LC
 Green acouchi, Myoprocta pratti LC
Family: Cuniculidae
Genus: Cuniculus
 Cuniculus hernandezi
 Lowland paca, Cuniculus paca LC
 Mountain paca, Cuniculus taczanowskii NT
Family: Ctenomyidae (tuco-tucos)
Genus: Ctenomys
 Argentine tuco-tuco, Ctenomys argentinus NT
 Southern tuco-tuco, Ctenomys australis EN
 Azara's tuco-tuco, Ctenomys azarae VU
 Berg's tuco-tuco, Ctenomys bergi VU
 Bolivian tuco-tuco, Ctenomys boliviensis LC
 Bonetto's tuco-tuco, Ctenomys bonettoi EN
 Brazilian tuco-tuco, Ctenomys brasiliensis DD
 Budin's tuco-tuco, Ctenomys budini DD
 Colburn's tuco-tuco, Ctenomys colburni DD
 Puntilla tuco-tuco, Ctenomys coludo DD
 Conover's tuco-tuco, Ctenomys conoveri LC
 Coyhaique tuco-tuco, Ctenomys coyhaiquensis DD
 D'Orbigny's tuco-tuco, Ctenomys dorbignyi NT
 Chacoan tuco-tuco, Ctenomys dorsalis DD
 Emily's tuco-tuco, Ctenomys emilianus NT
 Famatina tuco-tuco, Ctenomys famosus DD
 Flamarion's tuco-tuco, Ctenomys flamarioni EN
 Foch's tuco-tuco, Ctenomys fochi DD
 Lago Blanco tuco-tuco, Ctenomys fodax DD
 Reddish tuco-tuco, Ctenomys frater LC
 Tawny tuco-tuco, Ctenomys fulvus LC
 Goodfellow's tuco-tuco, Ctenomys goodfellowi LC
 Haig's tuco-tuco, Ctenomys haigi LC
 San Juan tuco-tuco, Ctenomys johannis DD
 Jujuy tuco-tuco, Ctenomys juris DD
 Catamarca tuco-tuco, Ctenomys knighti DD
 Lami tuco-tuco, Ctenomys lami VU
 Mottled tuco-tuco, Ctenomys latro VU
 White-toothed tuco-tuco, Ctenomys leucodon LC
 Lewis's tuco-tuco, Ctenomys lewisi LC
 Magellanic tuco-tuco, Ctenomys magellanicus VU
 Maule tuco-tuco, Ctenomys maulinus LC
 Mendoza tuco-tuco, Ctenomys mendocinus LC
 Tiny tuco-tuco, Ctenomys minutus DD
 Furtive tuco-tuco, Ctenomys occultus EN
 Highland tuco-tuco, Ctenomys opimus LC
 Reig's tuco-tuco, Ctenomys osvaldoreigi CR
 Ctenomys paraguayensis 
 Pearson's tuco-tuco, Ctenomys pearsoni NT
 Goya tuco-tuco, Ctenomys perrensi LC
 Peruvian tuco-tuco, Ctenomys peruanus LC
 Pilar tuco-tuco, Ctenomys pilarensis EN
 San Luis tuco-tuco, Ctenomys pontifex DD
 Porteous's tuco-tuco, Ctenomys porteousi NT
 Pundt's tuco-tuco, Ctenomys pundti VU
 Rio Negro tuco-tuco, Ctenomys rionegrensis EN
 Roig's tuco-tuco, Ctenomys roigi CR
 Salta tuco-tuco, Ctenomys saltarius DD
 Scaglia's tuco-tuco, Ctenomys scagliai DD
 Silky tuco-tuco, Ctenomys sericeus DD
 Social tuco-tuco, Ctenomys sociabilis CR
 Steinbach's tuco-tuco, Ctenomys steinbachi LC
 Forest tuco-tuco, Ctenomys sylvanus DD
 Talas tuco-tuco, Ctenomys talarum LC
 Collared tuco-tuco, Ctenomys torquatus LC
 Robust tuco-tuco, Ctenomys tuconax DD
 Tucuman tuco-tuco, Ctenomys tucumanus DD
 Sierra Tontal tuco-tuco, Ctenomys tulduco DD
 Strong tuco-tuco, Ctenomys validus DD
 Vipos tuco-tuco, Ctenomys viperinus DD
 Yolanda's tuco-tuco, Ctenomys yolandae DD
Family: Octodontidae
Genus: Aconaemys
 Chilean rock rat, Aconaemys fuscus LC
 Porter's rock rat, Aconaemys porteri DD
 Sage's rock rat, Aconaemys sagei DD
Genus: Octodon
 Bridges's degu, Octodon bridgesi VU
 Common degu, Octodon degus LC
 Moon-toothed degu, Octodon lunatus VU
 Pacific degu, Octodon pacificus CR
Genus: Octodontomys
 Mountain degu, Octodontomys gliroides LC
Genus: Octomys
 Mountain viscacha rat, Octomys mimax LC
Genus: Pipanacoctomys
Golden viscacha rat, Pipanacoctomys aureus CR
Genus: Spalacopus
 Coruro, Spalacopus cyanus LC
Genus: Tympanoctomys
 Plains viscacha rat, Tympanoctomys barrerae NT
 Kirchner's viscacha rat, Tympanoctomys kirchnerorum DD
Chalchalero viscacha rat, Tympanoctomys loschalchalerosorum CR
Family: Abrocomidae
Genus: Abrocoma
 Bennett's chinchilla rat, Abrocoma bennettii LC
 Bolivian chinchilla rat, Abrocoma boliviensis CR
 Budin's chinchilla rat, Abrocoma budini DD
 Ashy chinchilla rat, Abrocoma cinerea LC
 Famatina chinchilla rat, Abrocoma famatina DD
 Sierra del Tontal chinchilla rat, Abrocoma schistacea DD
 Uspallata chinchilla rat, Abrocoma uspallata DD
 Punta de Vacas chinchilla rat, Abrocoma vaccarum DD
Family: Echimyidae (spiny rats and allies)
Subfamily: Dactylomyinae
Genus: Kannabateomys
 Atlantic bamboo rat, Kannabateomys amblyonyx LC
Genus: Dactylomys
 Bolivian bamboo rat, Dactylomys boliviensis LC
 Amazon bamboo rat, Dactylomys dactylinus LC
 Montane bamboo rat, Dactylomys peruanus DD
Genus: Olallamys
 White-tailed olalla rat, Olallamys albicauda DD
 Greedy olalla rat, Olallamys edax DD
Subfamily: Echimyinae
Genus: Callistomys
 Painted tree-rat, Callistomys pictus EN
Genus: Diplomys
 Colombian soft-furred spiny rat, Diplomys caniceps DD
 Rufous soft-furred spiny rat, Diplomys labilis LC
Genus: Echimys
 White-faced spiny tree-rat, Echimys chrysurus LC
 Dark spiny tree-rat, Echimys saturnus DD
 Echimys vieirai DD
Genus: Isothrix
 Isothrix barbarabrownae DD
 Yellow-crowned brush-tailed rat, Isothrix bistriata LC
 Rio Negro brush-tailed rat, Isothrix negrensis LC
 Plain brush-tailed rat, Isothrix pagurus LC
 Sinnamary brush-tailed rat, Isothrix sinnamariensis LC
Genus: Makalata
 Makalata castaneus 
 Brazilian spiny tree-rat, Makalata didelphoides LC
 Makalata handleyi 
 Makalata guianae 
 Makalata longirostris 
 Long-tailed armored tree-rat, Makalata macrura LC
 Dusky spiny tree-rat, Makalata obscura DD
 Peruvian tree-rat, Makalata rhipidura DD
Genus: Pattonomys
 Bare-tailed armored tree-rat, Pattonomys occasius DD
 Speckled spiny tree-rat, Pattonomys semivillosus LC
Genus: Phyllomys
 Golden Atlantic tree-rat, Phyllomys blainvilii LC
 Orange-brown Atlantic tree-rat, Phyllomys brasiliensis EN
 Drab Atlantic tree-rat, Phyllomys dasythrix LC
 Kerr's Atlantic tree-rat, Phyllomys kerri DD
 Pallid Atlantic tree-rat, Phyllomys lamarum DD
 Lund's Atlantic tree-rat, Phyllomys lundi EN
 Mantiqueira Atlantic tree-rat, Phyllomys mantiqueirensis CR
 Long-furred Atlantic tree-rat, Phyllomys medius LC
 Black-spined Atlantic tree-rat, Phyllomys nigrispinus LC
 Rusty-sided Atlantic tree-rat, Phyllomys pattoni LC
 Phyllomys sulinus 
 Giant Atlantic tree-rat, Phyllomys thomasi EN
 Short-furred Atlantic tree-rat, Phyllomys unicolor CR
Genus: Santamartamys
 Red-crested tree-rat, Santamartamys rufodorsalis CR
Genus: Toromys
 Giant tree-rat, Toromys grandis LC
Subfamily: Eumysopinae
Genus: Carterodon
 Owl's spiny rat, Carterodon sulcidens DD
Genus: Clyomys
 Broad-headed spiny rat, Clyomys laticeps LC
Genus: Euryzygomatomys
 Brandt's guiara,  Euryzygomatomys guiara
 Fischer's guiara, Euryzygomatomys spinosus LC
Genus: Hoplomys
 Armored rat, Hoplomys gymnurus LC
Genus: Lonchothrix
 Tuft-tailed spiny tree rat, Lonchothrix emiliae LC
Genus: Mesomys
 Ferreira's spiny tree-rat, Mesomys hispidus LC
 Woolly-headed spiny tree-rat, Mesomys leniceps DD
 Tufted-tailed spiny tree-rat, Mesomys occultus LC
 Pará spiny tree-rat, Mesomys stimulax LC
Genus: Proechimys
 Short-tailed spiny rat, Proechimys brevicauda LC
 Colombian spiny rat, Proechimys canicollis LC
 Boyacá spiny rat, Proechimys chrysaeolus DD
 Cuvier's spiny rat, Proechimys cuvieri LC
 Pacific spiny rat, Proechimys decumanus VU
 Stiff-spine spiny rat, Proechimys echinothrix LC
 Gardner's spiny rat, Proechimys gardneri DD
 Goeldi's spiny rat, Proechimys goeldii VU
 Guaira spiny rat, Proechimys guairae LC
 Guyenne spiny rat, Proechimys guyannensis LC
 Guyanan spiny rat, Proechimys hoplomyoides DD
 Kulina spiny rat, Proechimys kulinae DD
 Long-tailed spiny rat, Proechimys longicaudatus LC
 Magdalena spiny rat, Proechimys magdalenae DD
 Minca spiny rat, Proechimys mincae DD
 O'Connell's spiny rat, Proechimys oconnelli DD
 Patton's spiny rat, Proechimys pattoni LC
 Gray-footed spiny rat, Proechimys poliopus VU
 Napo spiny rat, Proechimys quadruplicatus LC
 Roberto's spiny rat, Proechimys roberti VU
 Tome's spiny rat, Proechimys semispinosus LC
 Simon's spiny rat, Proechimys simonsi LC
 Steere's spiny rat, Proechimys steerei LC
 Trinidad spiny rat, Proechimys trinitatis DD
 Sucre spiny rat, Proechimys urichi LC
Genus: Thrichomys
 Common punaré, Thrichomys apereoides LC
 Thrichomys fosteri NE
 Highlands punaré, Thrichomys inermis LC
 Sao Lourenço punaré, Thrichomys laurentius DD
 Paraguayan punaré, Thrichomys pachyurus LC
Genus: Trinomys
 White-spined Atlantic spiny rat, Trinomys albispinus LC
 Soft-spined Atlantic spiny rat, Trinomys dimidiatus LC
 Elias' Atlantic spiny rat, Trinomys eliasi EN
 Gracile Atlantic spiny rat, Trinomys gratiosus LC
 Ihering's Atlantic spiny rat, Trinomys iheringi LC
 Dark-caped Atlantic spiny rat, Trinomys mirapitanga DD
 Moojen's Atlantic spiny rat, Trinomys moojeni EN
 Mouse-tailed Atlantic spiny rat, Trinomys myosuros LC
 Spiked Atlantic spiny rat, Trinomys paratus DD
 Hairy Atlantic spiny rat, Trinomys setosus LC
 Yonenaga's Atlantic spiny rat, Trinomys yonenagae EN
Family: Myocastoridae (coypus)
Genus: Myocastor
 Coypu, Myocastor coypus LC

Suborder: Sciuromorpha
Family: Sciuridae (squirrels)
Subfamily: Sciurillinae
Genus: Sciurillus
 Neotropical pygmy squirrel, Sciurillus pusillus DD
Subfamily: Sciurinae
Tribe: Sciurini
Genus: Microsciurus
 Central American dwarf squirrel, Microsciurus alfari LC
 Amazon dwarf squirrel, Microsciurus flaviventer DD
 Western dwarf squirrel, Microsciurus mimulus LC
 Santander dwarf squirrel, Microsciurus santanderensis DD
Genus: Sciurus
 Brazilian squirrel, Sciurus aestuans LC
 South Yungas red squirrel, Sciurus argentinius
 Fiery squirrel, Sciurus flammifer DD
 Yellow-throated squirrel, Sciurus gilvigularis DD
 Red-tailed squirrel, Sciurus granatensis LC
 Bolivian squirrel, Sciurus ignitus DD
 Northern Amazon red squirrel, Sciurus igniventris LC
 Atlantic Forest squirrel, Sciurus ingrami
 Andean squirrel, Sciurus pucheranii DD
 Junín red squirrel, Sciurus pyrrhinus DD
 Sanborn's squirrel, Sciurus sanborni DD
 Southern Amazon red squirrel, Sciurus spadiceus LC
 Guayaquil squirrel, Sciurus stramineus LC
Suborder: Castorimorpha
Family: Geomyidae
Genus: Orthogeomys
 Thaeler's pocket gopher, Orthogeomys thaeleri LC
Family: Heteromyidae
Subfamily: Heteromyinae
Genus: Heteromys
 Trinidad spiny pocket mouse, Heteromys anomalus LC
 Southern spiny pocket mouse, Heteromys australis LC
 Overlook spiny pocket mouse, Heteromys catopterius NE
 Desmarest's spiny pocket mouse, Heteromys desmarestianus LC
 Paraguaná spiny pocket mouse, Heteromys oasicus EN
 Ecuadoran spiny pocket mouse, Heteromys teleus VU

Suborder: Myomorpha
Family: Cricetidae
Subfamily: Tylomyinae
Genus: Tylomys
 Mira climbing rat, Tylomys mirae LC
Subfamily: Neotominae
Genus: Reithrodontomys
 Mexican harvest mouse, Reithrodontomys mexicanus LC
Subfamily: Sigmodontinae
Genus: Abrawayaomys
 Abrawayaomys chebezi
 Ruschi's rat, Abrawayaomys ruschii LC
Genus: Abrothrix
 Andean Altiplano mouse, Abrothrix andinus LC
 Hershkovitz's grass mouse, Abrothrix hershkovitzi LC
 Gray grass mouse, Abrothrix illuteus NT
 Jelski's Altiplano mouse, Abrothrix jelskii LC
 Woolly grass mouse, Abrothrix lanosus LC
 Long-haired grass mouse, Abrothrix longipilis LC
 Olive grass mouse, Abrothrix olivaceus LC
 Sanborn's grass mouse, Abrothrix sanborni NT
Genus: Aepeomys
 Olive montane mouse, Aepeomys lugens LC
 Reig's montane mouse, Aepeomys reigi VU
Genus: Aegialomys
 Galápagos rice rat, Aegialomys galapagoensis VU
 Yellowish rice rat, Aegialomys xanthaeolus LC
Genus: Akodon
 Highland grass mouse, Akodon aerosus LC
 Colombian grass mouse, Akodon affinis LC
 White-bellied grass mouse, Akodon albiventer LC
 Azara's grass mouse, Akodon azarae LC
 Bogotá grass mouse, Akodon bogotensis LC
 Bolivian grass mouse, Akodon boliviensis LC
 Budin's grass mouse, Akodon budini LC
 Akodon caenosus
 Cursor grass mouse, Akodon cursor LC
 Day's grass mouse, Akodon dayi LC
 Dolorous grass mouse, Akodon dolores LC
 Smoky grass mouse, Akodon fumeus LC
 Akodon glaucinus 
 Intelligent grass mouse, Akodon iniscatus LC
 Junín grass mouse, Akodon juninensis LC
 Koford's grass mouse, Akodon kofordi LC
 Ecuadorian grass mouse, Akodon latebricola VU
 Lindbergh's grass mouse, Akodon lindberghi DD
 Altiplano grass mouse, Akodon lutescens LC
 Thespian grass mouse, Akodon mimus LC
 Soft grass mouse, Akodon mollis LC
 Montane grass mouse, Akodon montensis LC
 Caparaó grass mouse, Akodon mystax DD
 Neuquén grass mouse, Akodon neocenus DD
 El Dorado grass mouse, Akodon orophilus LC
 Paraná grass mouse, Akodon paranaensis LC
 Tarija akodont, Akodon pervalens DD
 Philip Myers's akodont, Akodon philipmyersi DD
 Akodon polopi 
 Reig's grass mouse, Akodon reigi LC
 São Paulo grass mouse, Akodon sanctipaulensis DD
 Serra do Mar grass mouse, Akodon serrensis LC
 Cochabamba grass mouse, Akodon siberiae NT
 White-throated grass mouse, Akodon simulator LC
 Spegazzini's grass mouse, Akodon spegazzinii LC
 Puno grass mouse, Akodon subfuscus LC
 Silent grass mouse, Akodon surdus VU
 Forest grass mouse, Akodon sylvanus LC
 Akodon tartareus 
 Chaco grass mouse, Akodon toba LC
 Cloud forest grass mouse, Akodon torques LC
 Variable grass mouse, Akodon varius DD
Genus: Amphinectomys
 Ucayali water rat, Amphinectomys savamis DD
Genus: Andalgalomys
 Olrog's chaco mouse, Andalgalomys olrogi LC
 Pearson's chaco mouse, Andalgalomys pearsoni LC
Genus: Andinomys
 Andean mouse, Andinomys edax LC
 Andinomys lineicaudatus 
Genus: Anotomys
 Aquatic rat, Anotomys leander VU
Genus: Auliscomys
 Bolivian big-eared mouse, Auliscomys boliviensis LC
 Painted big-eared mouse, Auliscomys pictus LC
 Andean big-eared mouse, Auliscomys sublimis LC
Genus: Bibimys
 Chaco crimson-nosed rat, Bibimys chacoensis LC
 Large-lipped crimson-nosed rat, Bibimys labiosus LC
 Torres' crimson-nosed rat, Bibimys torresi NT
Genus: Blarinomys
 Brazilian shrew-mouse, Blarinomys breviceps LC
Genus: Brucepattersonius
 Gray-bellied brucie, Brucepattersonius griserufescens DD
 Guaraní brucie, Brucepattersonius guarani DD
 Red-bellied brucie, Brucepattersonius igniventris DD
 Ihering's hocicudo, Brucepattersonius iheringi LC
 Misiones brucie, Brucepattersonius misionensis DD
 Arroyo of Paradise brucie, Brucepattersonius paradisus DD
 Soricine brucie, Brucepattersonius soricinus DD
Genus: Calomys
 Bolivian vesper mouse, Calomys boliviae LC
 Crafty vesper mouse, Calomys callidus LC
 Large vesper mouse, Calomys callosus LC
 Calomys cerqueirai
 Caatinga vesper mouse, Calomys expulsus LC
 Fecund vesper mouse, Calomys fecundus LC
 Hummelinck's vesper mouse, Calomys hummelincki VU
 Small vesper mouse, Calomys laucha LC
 Andean vesper mouse, Calomys lepidus LC
 Drylands vesper mouse, Calomys musculinus LC
 Peruvian vesper mouse, Calomys sorellus LC
 Delicate vesper mouse, Calomys tener LC
 Tocantins vesper mouse, Calomys tocantinsi LC
 Córdoba vesper mouse, Calomys venustus LC
Genus: Cerradomys
 Langguth's rice rat, Cerradomys langguthi
 Maracaju rice rat, Cerradomys maracajuensis LC
 Marinho's rice rat, Cerradomys marinhus DD
 Lindbergh's rice rat, Cerradomys scotti LC
 Terraced rice rat, Cerradomys subflavus LC
 Vivo's rice rat, Cerradomys vivoi
Genus: Chelemys
 Magellanic long-clawed mouse, Chelemys delfini DD
 Andean long-clawed mouse, Chelemys macronyx LC
 Large long-clawed mouse, Chelemys megalonyx NT
Genus: Chibchanomys
 Las Cajas water mouse, Chibchanomys orcesi DD
 Chibchan water mouse, Chibchanomys trichotis DD
Genus: Chilomys
 Colombian forest mouse, Chilomys instans LC
Genus: Chinchillula
 Altiplano chinchilla mouse, Chinchillula sahamae LC
Genus: Delomys
 Delomys altimontanus
 Montane Atlantic Forest rat, Delomys collinus LC
 Striped Atlantic Forest rat, Delomys dorsalis LC
 Pallid Atlantic Forest rat, Delomys sublineatus LC
Genus: Deltamys
 Kemp's grass mouse, Deltamys kempi LC
Genus: Drymoreomys
 Drymoreomys albimaculatus NT
Genus: Eligmodontia
 Eligmodontia bolsonensis 
 Eligmodontia hirtipes 
 Monte gerbil mouse, Eligmodontia moreni LC
 Morgan's gerbil mouse, Eligmodontia morgani LC
 Andean gerbil mouse, Eligmodontia puerulus LC
 Highland gerbil mouse, eastern Patagonian gerbil mouse, Eligmodontia typus LC
Genus: Eremoryzomys
 Gray rice rat, Eremoryzomys polius DD
Genus: Euneomys
 Patagonian chinchilla mouse, Euneomys chinchilloides DD
 Burrowing chinchilla mouse, Euneomys fossor DD
 Biting chinchilla mouse, Euneomys mordax LC
 Peterson's chinchilla mouse, Euneomys petersoni LC
Genus: Euryoryzomys
 Emmons's rice rat, Euryoryzomys emmonsae DD
 Monster rice rat, Euryoryzomys lamia EN
 Tarija rice rat, Euryoryzomys legatus LC
 MacConnell's rice rat, Euryoryzomys macconnelli LC
 Elegant rice rat, Euryoryzomys nitidus LC
 Russet rice rat, Euryoryzomys russatus LC
Genus: Galenomys
 Garlepp's mouse, Galenomys garleppi DD
Genus: Geoxus
 Long-clawed mole mouse, Geoxus valdivianus LC
Genus: Graomys
 Graomys chacoensis (contains the former Graomys centralis)
 Pale leaf-eared mouse, Graomys domorum LC
 Edith's leaf-eared mouse, Graomys edithae DD
 Gray leaf-eared mouse, Graomys griseoflavus LC
Genus: Gyldenstolpia
 Fossorial giant rat, Gyldenstolpia fronto EN
Gyldenstolpia planaltensis
Genus: Handleyomys
 Alfaro's rice rat, Handleyomys alfaroi LC
 Dusky montane mouse, Handleyomys fuscatus LC
 Colombian rice rat, Handleyomys intectus LC
Genus: Holochilus
 Web-footed marsh rat, Holochilus brasiliensis LC
 Chaco marsh rat, Holochilus chacarius LC
 Amazonian marsh rat, Holochilus sciureus LC
Genus: Hylaeamys
 Hylaeamys acritus DD
 Large-headed rice rat, Hylaeamys laticeps NT
 Azara's broad-headed rice rat, Hylaeamys megacephalus LC
 Sowbug rice rat, Hylaeamys oniscus VU
 Western Amazonian oryzomys, Hylaeamys perenensis LC
 Tate's rice rat, Hylaeamys tatei DD
 Yungas rice rat, Hylaeamys yunganus LC
Genus: Ichthyomys
 Crab-eating rat, Ichthyomys hydrobates NT
 Pittier's crab-eating rat, Ichthyomys pittieri VU
 Stolzmann's crab-eating rat, Ichthyomys stolzmanni DD
 Tweedy's crab-eating rat, Ichthyomys tweedii DD
Genus: Irenomys
 Chilean climbing mouse, Irenomys tarsalis LC
Genus: Juliomys
 †Juliomys anoblepas EX
 Juliomys ossitenuis NE
 Lesser Wilfred's mouse, Juliomys pictipes LC
 Cleft-headed juliomys, Juliomys rimofrons VU
 Aracuaria Forest tree mouse, Juliomys ximenezi NE
Genus: Juscelinomys
 Candango mouse, †Juscelinomys candango EX
 Rio Guaporé mouse, Juscelinomys guaporensis DD
 Huanchaca mouse, Juscelinomys huanchacae DD
Genus: Kunsia
 Woolly giant rat, Kunsia tomentosus LC
Genus: Lenoxus
 Andean rat, Lenoxus apicalis LC
Genus: Loxodontomys
 Southern big-eared mouse, Loxodontomys micropus LC
 Pikumche pericote, Loxodontomys pikumche LC
Genus: Lundomys
 Lund's amphibious rat, Lundomys molitor LC
Genus: Megaoryzomys
 Galápagos giant rat, †Megaoryzomys curioi EX
Genus: Melanomys
 Dusky rice rat, Melanomys caliginosus LC
 Robust dark rice rat, Melanomys robustulus LC
 Zuniga's dark rice rat, Melanomys zunigae CR
Genus: Microakodontomys
 Intermediate lesser grass mouse, Microakodontomys transitorius VU
Genus: Microryzomys
 Highland small rice rat, Microryzomys altissimus LC
 Forest small rice rat, Microryzomys minutus LC
Genus: Mindomys
 Hammond's rice rat, Mindomys hammondi EN
Genus: Neacomys
 Dubost's bristly mouse, Neacomys dubosti LC
 Guiana bristly mouse, Neacomys guianae LC
 Jurua bristly mouse, Neacomys minutus LC
 Musser's bristly mouse, Neacomys musseri LC
 Paracou bristly mouse, Neacomys paracou LC
 Common bristly mouse, Neacomys spinosus LC
 Narrow-footed bristly mouse, Neacomys tenuipes LC
Genus: Necromys
 Pleasant bolo mouse, Necromys amoenus LC
 Argentine bolo mouse, Necromys benefactus LC
 Rufous-bellied bolo mouse, Necromys lactens LC
 Hairy-tailed bolo mouse, Necromys lasiurus LC
 Paraguayan bolo mouse, Necromys lenguarum LC
 Dark bolo mouse, Necromys obscurus NT
 Spotted bolo mouse, Necromys punctulatus DD
 Temchuk's bolo mouse, Necromys temchuki LC
 Northern grass mouse, Necromys urichi LC
Genus: Nectomys
 Western Amazonian water rat, Nectomys apicalis LC
 Magdalena water rat, Nectomys magdalenae DD
 Trinidad water rat, Nectomys palmipes LC
 Small-footed bristly mouse, Nectomys rattus LC
 Scaly-footed water rat, Nectomys squamipes LC
Genus: Neotomys
 Andean swamp rat, Neotomys ebriosus LC
Genus: Nephelomys
 Tomes's rice rat, Nephelomys albigularis LC
 Nephelomys auriventer LC
 Costa Central rice rat, Nephelomys caracolus LC
 Nephelomys childi
 Keays's rice rat, Nephelomys keaysi LC
 Light-footed rice rat, Nephelomys levipes LC
 Nephelomys maculiventer
 Mérida rice rat, Nephelomys meridensis LC
 Nephelomys moerex
 Nephelomys nimbosus
 Nephelomys pectoralis
Genus: Nesoryzomys
 Darwin's rice rat, †Nesoryzomys darwini EX
 Fernandina rice rat, Nesoryzomys fernandinae VU
 Indefatigable Galápagos mouse, †Nesoryzomys indefessus EX
 Fernandina Island Galápagos mouse, Nesoryzomys narboroughi VU
 Santiago Galápagos mouse, Nesoryzomys swarthi VU
Genus: Neusticomys
 Ferreira's fish-eating rat, Neusticomys ferreirai DD
 Montane fish-eating rat, Neusticomys monticolus LC
 Musso's fish-eating rat, Neusticomys mussoi EN
 Oyapock's fish-eating rat, Neusticomys oyapocki DD
 Peruvian fish-eating rat, Neusticomys peruviensis LC
 Venezuelan fish-eating rat, Neusticomys venezuelae VU
Genus: Noronhomys
 Vespucci's rodent, †Noronhomys vespuccii EX
Genus: Notiomys
 Edward's long-clawed mouse, Notiomys edwardsii LC
Genus: Oecomys
 Guianan arboreal rice rat, Oecomys auyantepui LC
 Bicolored arboreal rice rat, Oecomys bicolor LC
 Atlantic Forest arboreal rice rat, Oecomys catherinae LC
 Cleber's arboreal rice rat, Oecomys cleberi DD
 Unicolored arboreal rice rat, Oecomys concolor LC
 Yellow arboreal rice rat, Oecomys flavicans LC
 Mamore arboreal rice rat, Oecomys mamorae LC
 Brazilian arboreal rice rat, Oecomys paricola DD
 Dusky arboreal rice rat, Oecomys phaeotis LC
 King arboreal rice rat, Oecomys rex LC
 Robert's arboreal rice rat, Oecomys roberti LC
 Red arboreal rice rat, Oecomys rutilus LC
 Venezuelan arboreal rice rat, Oecomys speciosus LC
 Foothill arboreal rice rat, Oecomys superans LC
 Oecomys sydandersoni
 Trinidad arboreal rice rat, Oecomys trinitatis LC
Genus: Oligoryzomys
 Andean pygmy rice rat, Oligoryzomys andinus LC
 Sandy pygmy rice rat, Oligoryzomys arenalis LC
 Brenda's colilargo, Oligoryzomys brendae DD
 Chacoan pygmy rice rat, Oligoryzomys chacoensis LC
 Destructive pygmy rice rat, Oligoryzomys destructor LC
 Yellow pygmy rice rat, Oligoryzomys flavescens LC
 Fornes' colilargo, Oligoryzomys fornesi LC
 Fulvous pygmy rice rat, Oligoryzomys fulvescens LC
 Grayish pygmy rice rat, Oligoryzomys griseolus LC
 Long-tailed pygmy rice rat, Oligoryzomys longicaudatus LC
 Magellanic pygmy rice rat, Oligoryzomys magellanicus LC
 Small-eared pygmy rice rat, Oligoryzomys microtis LC
 Moojen's pygmy rice rat, Oligoryzomys moojeni DD
 Black-footed pygmy rice rat, Oligoryzomys nigripes LC
 Rock pygmy rice rat, Oligoryzomys rupestris DD
 Straw-colored pygmy rice rat, Oligoryzomys stramineus LC
Genus: Oreoryzomys
 Peruvian rice rat, Oreoryzomys balneator DD
Genus: Oryzomys
 Coues's rice rat, Oryzomys couesi LC
 Gorgas's rice rat, Oryzomys gorgasi EN
Genus: Oxymycterus
 Argentine hocicudo, Oxymycterus akodontius DD
 Amazonian hocicudo, Oxymycterus amazonicus LC
 Angular hocicudo, Oxymycterus angularis LC
 Caparaó hocicudo, Oxymycterus caparoae LC
 Atlantic Forest hocicudo, Oxymycterus dasytrichus LC
 Spy hocicudo, Oxymycterus delator LC
 Small hocicudo, Oxymycterus hiska LC
 Hispid hocicudo, Oxymycterus hispidus LC
 Quechuan hocicudo, Oxymycterus hucucha EN
 Incan hocicudo, Oxymycterus inca LC
 Cook's hocicudo, Oxymycterus josei EN
 Long-nosed hocicudo, Oxymycterus nasutus LC
 Paramo hocicudo, Oxymycterus paramensis LC
 Quaestor hocicudo, Oxymycterus quaestor LC
 Robert's hocicudo, Oxymycterus roberti LC
 Red hocicudo, Oxymycterus rufus LC
 Oxymycterus wayku
Genus: Paralomys
 Gerbil leaf-eared mouse, Paralomys gerbillus LC
Genus: Pearsonomys
 Pearson's long-clawed mouse, Pearsonomys annectens VU
Genus: Phaenomys
 Rio de Janeiro arboreal rat, Phaenomys ferrugineus VU
Genus: Phyllotis
 Phyllotis alisosiensis
 Friendly leaf-eared mouse, Phyllotis amicus LC
 Andean leaf-eared mouse, Phyllotis andium LC
 Anita's leaf-eared mouse, Phyllotis anitae DD
 Buenos Aires leaf-eared mouse, Phyllotis bonariensis NT
 Capricorn leaf-eared mouse, Phyllotis caprinus LC
 Darwin's leaf-eared mouse, Phyllotis darwini LC
 Definitive leaf-eared mouse, Phyllotis definitus EN
 Haggard's leaf-eared mouse, Phyllotis haggardi LC
 Lima leaf-eared mouse, Phyllotis limatus LC
 Master leaf-eared mouse, Phyllotis magister LC
 Osgood's leaf-eared mouse, Phyllotis osgoodi DD
 Bunchgrass leaf-eared mouse, Phyllotis osilae LC
 Wolffsohn's leaf-eared mouse, Phyllotis wolffsohni LC
 Yellow-rumped leaf-eared mouse, Phyllotis xanthopygus LC
Genus: Podoxymys
 Roraima mouse, Podoxymys roraimae VU
Genus: Pseudoryzomys
 Brazilian false rice rat, Pseudoryzomys simplex LC
Genus: Punomys
 Eastern puna mouse, Punomys kofordi VU
 Puna mouse, Punomys lemminus VU
Genus: Reithrodon
 Bunny rat, Reithrodon auritus LC
 Naked-soled conyrat, Reithrodon typicus LC
Genus: Rhagomys
 Long-tongued arboreal mouse, Rhagomys longilingua LC
 Brazilian arboreal mouse, Rhagomys rufescens NT
Genus: Rhipidomys
 Southern climbing mouse, Rhipidomys austrinus LC
 Cariri climbing mouse, Rhipidomys cariri DD
 Cauca climbing mouse, Rhipidomys caucensis DD
 Coues's climbing mouse, Rhipidomys couesi LC
 Eastern Amazon climbing mouse, Rhipidomys emiliae LC
 Buff-bellied climbing mouse, Rhipidomys fulviventer LC
 Gardner's climbing mouse, Rhipidomys gardneri LC
 Broad-footed climbing mouse, Rhipidomys latimanus LC
 White-footed climbing mouse, Rhipidomys leucodactylus LC
 MacConnell's climbing mouse, Rhipidomys macconnelli LC
 Cerrado climbing mouse, Rhipidomys macrurus LC
 Atlantic Forest climbing mouse, Rhipidomys mastacalis LC
 Peruvian climbing mouse, Rhipidomys modicus LC
 Splendid climbing mouse, Rhipidomys nitela LC
 Yellow-bellied climbing mouse, Rhipidomys ochrogaster DD
 Venezuelan climbing mouse, Rhipidomys venezuelae LC
 Charming climbing mouse, Rhipidomys venustus LC
 Wetzel's climbing mouse, Rhipidomys wetzeli LC
Genus: Salinomys
 Delicate salt flat mouse, Salinomys delicatus DD
Genus: Scapteromys
 Argentine swamp rat, Scapteromys aquaticus LC
 Plateau swamp rat, Scapteromys meridionalis
 Waterhouse's swamp rat, Scapteromys tumidus LC
Genus: Scolomys
 South American spiny mouse, Scolomys melanops LC
 Ucayali spiny mouse, Scolomys ucayalensis LC
Genus: Sigmodon
 Alston's cotton rat, Sigmodon alstoni LC
 Southern cotton rat, Sigmodon hirsutus LC
 Unexpected cotton rat, Sigmodon inopinatus VU
 Peruvian cotton rat, Sigmodon peruanus LC
Genus: Sigmodontomys
 Alfaro's rice water rat, Sigmodontomys alfari LC
 Harris's rice water rat, Sigmodontomys aphrastus DD
Genus: Sooretamys
 Paraguayan rice rat, Sooretamys angouya LC
Genus: Tapecomys
 Tapecomys wolffsohni 
 Primordial tapecua, Tapecomys primus LC
Genus: Thalpomys
 Cerrado mouse, Thalpomys cerradensis LC
 Hairy-eared cerrado mouse, Thalpomys lasiotis LC
Genus: Thaptomys
 Blackish grass mouse, Thaptomys nigrita LC
Genus: Thomasomys
 Anderson's Oldfield mouse, Thomasomys andersoni
 Apeco Oldfield mouse, Thomasomys apeco VU
 Golden Oldfield mouse, Thomasomys aureus LC
 Beady-eyed mouse, Thomasomys baeops LC
 Silky Oldfield mouse, Thomasomys bombycinus DD
 White-tipped Oldfield mouse, Thomasomys caudivarius LC
 Ashy-bellied Oldfield mouse, Thomasomys cinereiventer LC
 Ash-colored Oldfield mouse, Thomasomys cinereus LC
 Cinnamon-colored Oldfield mouse, Thomasomys cinnameus LC
 Daphne's Oldfield mouse, Thomasomys daphne LC
 Peruvian Oldfield mouse, Thomasomys eleusis LC
 Wandering Oldfield mouse, Thomasomys erro LC
 Slender Oldfield mouse, Thomasomys gracilis NT
 Hudson's Oldfield mouse, Thomasomys hudsoni DD
 Woodland Oldfield mouse, Thomasomys hylophilus EN
 Inca Oldfield mouse, Thomasomys incanus VU
 Strong-tailed Oldfield mouse, Thomasomys ischyurus VU
 Kalinowski's Oldfield mouse, Thomasomys kalinowskii VU
 Ladew's Oldfield mouse, Thomasomys ladewi LC
 Soft-furred Oldfield mouse, Thomasomys laniger LC
 Large-eared Oldfield mouse, Thomasomys macrotis VU
 Unicolored Oldfield mouse, Thomasomys monochromos EN
 Snow-footed Oldfield mouse, Thomasomys niveipes LC
 Distinguished Oldfield mouse, Thomasomys notatus LC
 Ashaninka Oldfield mouse, Thomasomys onkiro VU
 Montane Oldfield mouse, Thomasomys oreas LC
 Paramo Oldfield mouse, Thomasomys paramorum LC
 Popayán Oldfield mouse, Thomasomys popayanus DD
 Cajamarca Oldfield mouse, Thomasomys praetor DD
 Thomas's Oldfield mouse, Thomasomys pyrrhonotus VU
 Rhoads's Oldfield mouse, Thomasomys rhoadsi LC
 Rosalinda's Oldfield mouse, Thomasomys rosalinda DD
 Forest Oldfield mouse, Thomasomys silvestris LC
 Taczanowski's Oldfield mouse, Thomasomys taczanowskii LC
 Ucucha Oldfield mouse, Thomasomys ucucha VU
 Dressy Oldfield mouse, Thomasomys vestitus LC
 Pichincha Oldfield mouse, Thomasomys vulcani DD
Genus: Transandinomys
 Bolivar rice rat, Transandinomys bolivaris LC
 Talamancan rice rat, Transandinomys talamancae LC
Genus: Wiedomys
 Cerrado red-nosed mouse, Wiedomys cerradensis DD
 Red-nosed mouse, Wiedomys pyrrhorhinos LC 
Genus: Wilfredomys 
 Greater Wilfred's mouse, Wilfredomys oenax EN
Genus: Zygodontomys
 Short-tailed cane mouse, Zygodontomys brevicauda LC
 Brown cane mouse, Zygodontomys brunneus LC

Order: Lagomorpha (lagomorphs)

The lagomorphs comprise two families, Leporidae (hares and rabbits), and Ochotonidae (pikas). Though they can resemble rodents, and were classified as a superfamily in that order until the early 20th century, they have since been considered a separate order. They differ from rodents in a number of physical characteristics, such as having four incisors in the upper jaw rather than two. South America's meager lagomorph diversity (6 species compared to 18 for North America north of Mexico) reflects their recent arrival and failure (so far) to diversify much. Only the tapeti is present south of northern South America; lagomorphs are absent from most of South America's southern cone.

Family: Leporidae (rabbits, hares)
Genus: Sylvilagus
 Andean cottontail, Sylvilagus andinus NE
 Tapeti, Sylvilagus brasiliensis LC
 Eastern cottontail, Sylvilagus floridanus LC
 Suriname lowland forest cottontail, Sylvilagus parentum NE
 Rio de Janeiro dwarf rabbit, Sylvilagus tapetillus NE
 Venezuelan lowland rabbit, Sylvilagus varynaensis DD

Superorder: Laurasiatheria

Order: Eulipotyphla (shrews, hedgehogs, moles, and solenodons)

Eulipotyphlans are insectivorous mammals. Shrews and solenodons closely resemble mice, hedgehogs carry spines, while moles are stout-bodied burrowers. In South America, shrews are only found in the north (Colombia, Venezuela, Ecuador and Peru), a legacy of their relatively recent immigration to the continent by way of Central America (where shrew species are considerably more diverse). Moles are not found in the Americas south of northern Mexico.

Family: Soricidae (shrews)
Subfamily: Soricinae
Tribe: Blarinini
Genus: Cryptotis
C. nigrescens group
 Eastern Cordillera small-footed shrew, Cryptotis brachyonyx DD
 Colombian small-eared shrew, Cryptotis colombiana LC
 Darién small-eared shrew, Cryptotis mera EN
C. thomasi group
 Ecuadoran small-eared shrew, Cryptotis equatoris LC
 Medellín small-eared shrew, Cryptotis medellinia LC
 Merida small-eared shrew, Cryptotis meridensis LC
 Wandering small-eared shrew, Cryptotis montivaga LC
 Peruvian small-eared shrew, Cryptotis peruviensis DD
 Scaly-footed small-eared shrew, Cryptotis squamipes LC
 Tamá small-eared shrew, Cryptotis tamensis LC
 Thomas' small-eared shrew, Cryptotis thomasi LC

Order: Chiroptera (bats)

The bats' most distinguishing feature is that their forelimbs are developed as wings, making them the only mammals capable of flight. Bat species account for about 20% of all mammals.

Family: Noctilionidae (bulldog bats)
Genus: Noctilio
 Lesser bulldog bat, Noctilio albiventris LC
 Greater bulldog bat, Noctilio leporinus LC
Family: Vespertilionidae
Subfamily: Myotinae
Genus: Myotis
 Southern myotis, Myotis aelleni DD
 Silver-tipped myotis, Myotis albescens LC
 Atacama myotis, Myotis atacamensis NT
 Chilean myotis, Myotis chiloensis LC
 Myotis dinellii LC
 Hairy-legged myotis, Myotis keaysi LC
 Yellowish myotis, Myotis levis LC
 Myotis midastactus NE
 Curacao myotis, Myotis nesopolus LC
 Black myotis, Myotis nigricans LC
 Montane myotis, Myotis oxyotus LC
 Riparian myotis, Myotis riparius LC
 Red myotis, Myotis ruber NT
 Velvety myotis, Myotis simus DD
Subfamily: Vespertilioninae
Genus: Eptesicus
 Little black serotine, Eptesicus andinus LC
 Brazilian brown bat, Eptesicus brasiliensis LC
 Chiriquinan serotine, Eptesicus chiriquinus LC
 Diminutive serotine, Eptesicus diminutus DD
 Argentine brown bat, Eptesicus furinalis LC
 Big brown bat, Eptesicus fuscus LC
 Harmless serotine, Eptesicus innoxius NT
 Eptesicus taddeii
Genus: Histiotus
 Strange big-eared brown bat, Histiotus alienus DD
 Humboldt big-eared brown bat, Histiotus humboldti DD
 Thomas's big-eared brown bat, Histiotus laephotis NT
 Big-eared brown bat, Histiotus macrotus LC
 Southern big-eared brown bat, Histiotus magellanicus LC
 Small big-eared brown bat, Histiotus montanus LC
 Tropical big-eared brown bat, Histiotus velatus DD
Genus: Lasiurus
 Lasiurus atratus LC
 Desert red bat, Lasiurus blossevillii LC
 Tacarcuna bat, Lasiurus castaneus DD
 Hoary bat, Lasiurus cinereus LC
 Hairy-tailed bat, Lasiurus ebenus DD
 Southern yellow bat, Lasiurus ega LC
 Big red bat, Lasiurus egregius DD
 Pfeiffer's red bat, Lasiurus pfeifferi 
 Saline red bat, Lasiurus salinae 
 Cinnamon red bat, Lasiurus varius LC
Genus: Rhogeessa
 Husson's yellow bat, Rhogeessa hussoni DD
 Thomas's yellow bat, Rhogeessa io LC
 Tiny yellow bat, Rhogeessa minutilla VU
Subfamily: Tomopeatinae
Genus: Tomopeas
 Blunt-eared bat, Tomopeas ravus VU

Family: Molossidae (free-tailed bats)
Genus: Cynomops
 Cinnamon dog-faced bat, Cynomops abrasus DD
 Greenhall's dog-faced bat, Cynomops greenhalli LC
 Para dog-faced bat, Cynomops paranus DD
 Southern dog-faced bat, Cynomops planirostris LC
Genus: Eumops
 Black bonneted bat, Eumops auripendulus LC
 Dwarf bonneted bat, Eumops bonariensis LC
 Big bonneted bat, Eumops dabbenei LC
 Wagner's bonneted bat, Eumops glaucinus LC
 Sanborn's bonneted bat, Eumops hansae LC
 Guianan bonneted bat, Eumops maurus DD
 Patagonian bonneted bat, Eumops patagonicus LC
 Western mastiff bat, Eumops perotis LC
 Colombian bonneted bat, Eumops trumbulli LC
 Wilson's bonneted bat, Eumops wilsoni 
Genus: Molossops
 Equatorial dog-faced bat, Molossops aequatorianus VU
 Mato Grosso dog-faced bat, Molossops mattogrossensis LC
 Rufous dog-faced bat, Molossops neglectus DD
 Dwarf dog-faced bat, Molossops temminckii LC
Genus: Molossus
 Barnes's mastiff bat, Molossus barnesi DD
 Coiban mastiff bat, Molossus coibensis LC
 Bonda mastiff bat, Molossus currentium LC
 Velvety free-tailed bat, Molossus molossus LC
 Miller's mastiff bat, Molossus pretiosus LC
 Black mastiff bat, Molossus rufus LC
 Sinaloan mastiff bat, Molossus sinaloae LC
 Molossus trinitatis
Genus: Mormopterus
 Kalinowski's mastiff bat, Mormopterus kalinowskii LC
 Incan little mastiff bat, Mormopterus phrudus VU
Genus: Nyctinomops
 Peale's free-tailed bat, Nyctinomops aurispinosus LC
 Broad-eared bat, Nyctinomops laticaudatus LC
 Big free-tailed bat, Nyctinomops macrotis LC
Genus: Promops
 Big crested mastiff bat, Promops centralis LC
 Brown mastiff bat, Promops nasutus LC
Genus: Tadarida
 Mexican free-tailed bat, Tadarida brasiliensis LC
Family: Emballonuridae (ghost bats, sac-winged bats and allies)
Genus: Balantiopteryx
 Ecuadorian sac-winged bat, Balantiopteryx infusca EN
 Gray sac-winged bat, Balantiopteryx plicata LC
Genus: Centronycteris
 Thomas's shaggy bat, Centronycteris centralis LC
 Shaggy bat, Centronycteris maximiliani LC
Genus: Cormura
 Chestnut sac-winged bat, Cormura brevirostris LC
Genus: Cyttarops
 Short-eared bat, Cyttarops alecto LC
Genus: Diclidurus
 Northern ghost bat, Diclidurus albus LC
 Greater ghost bat, Diclidurus ingens DD
 Isabelle's ghost bat, Diclidurus isabella LC
 Lesser ghost bat, Diclidurus scutatus LC
Genus: Peropteryx
 Greater dog-like bat, Peropteryx kappleri LC
 White-winged dog-like bat, Peropteryx leucoptera LC
 Lesser doglike bat, Peropteryx macrotis LC
 Trinidad dog-like bat, Peropteryx trinitatis DD
 Pale-winged dog-like bat, Peropteryx pallidoptera
Genus: Rhynchonycteris
 Proboscis bat, Rhynchonycteris naso LC
Genus: Saccopteryx
 Antioquian sac-winged bat, Saccopteryx antioquensis DD
 Greater sac-winged bat, Saccopteryx bilineata LC
 Frosted sac-winged bat, Saccopteryx canescens LC
 Amazonian sac-winged bat, Saccopteryx gymnura DD
 Lesser sac-winged bat, Saccopteryx leptura LC

Family: Mormoopidae (mustached bats)
Genus: Mormoops
 Ghost-faced bat, Mormoops megalophylla LC
Genus: Pteronotus
 Davy's naked-backed bat, Pteronotus davyi LC
 Big naked-backed bat, Pteronotus gymnonotus LC
 Paraguana moustached bat, Pteronotus paraguanensis EN
 Parnell's mustached bat, Pteronotus parnellii LC
 Wagner's mustached bat, Pteronotus personatus LC

Family: Phyllostomidae (leaf-nosed bats)
Subfamily: Phyllostominae
Genus: Chrotopterus
 Big-eared woolly bat, Chrotopterus auritus LC
Genus: Glyphonycteris
 Behn's bat, Glyphonycteris behnii DD
 Davies's big-eared bat, Glyphonycteris daviesi LC
 Tricolored big-eared bat, Glyphonycteris sylvestris LC
Genus: Lampronycteris
 Yellow-throated big-eared bat, Lampronycteris brachyotis LC
Genus: Lonchorhina
 Tomes's sword-nosed bat, Lonchorhina aurita LC
 Fernandez's sword-nosed bat, Lonchorhina fernandezi EN
 Northern sword-nosed bat, Lonchorhina inusitata DD
 Marinkelle's sword-nosed bat, Lonchorhina marinkellei EN
 Orinoco sword-nosed bat, Lonchorhina orinocensis VU
Genus: Lophostoma
 Lophostoma aequatorialis DD
 Pygmy round-eared bat, Lophostoma brasiliense LC
 Carriker's round-eared bat, Lophostoma carrikeri LC
 Schultz's round-eared bat, Lophostoma schulzi LC
 White-throated round-eared bat, Lophostoma silvicolum LC
 Lophostoma yasuni DD
Genus: Macrophyllum
 Long-legged bat, Macrophyllum macrophyllum LC
Genus: Micronycteris
 Brosset's big-eared bat, Micronycteris brosseti DD
 Micronycteris giovanniae
 Hairy big-eared bat, Micronycteris hirsuta LC
 Pirlot's big-eared bat, Micronycteris homezi
 Matses' big-eared bat, Micronycteris matses DD
 Little big-eared bat, Micronycteris megalotis LC
 Common big-eared bat, Micronycteris microtis LC
 White-bellied big-eared bat, Micronycteris minuta LC
 Sanborn's big-eared bat, Micronycteris sanborni DD
 Schmidts's big-eared bat, Micronycteris schmidtorum LC
Genus: Mimon
 Golden bat, Mimon bennettii LC
 Cozumelan golden bat, Mimon cozumelae LC
 Striped hairy-nosed bat, Mimon crenulatum LC
 Koepcke's hairy-nosed bat, Mimon koepckeae DD
Genus: Neonycteris
 Least big-eared bat, Neonycteris pusilla VU
Genus: Phylloderma
 Pale-faced bat, Phylloderma stenops LC
Genus: Phyllostomus
 Pale spear-nosed bat, Phyllostomus discolor LC
 Lesser spear-nosed bat, Phyllostomus elongatus LC
 Greater spear-nosed bat, Phyllostomus hastatus LC
 Guianan spear-nosed bat, Phyllostomus latifolius LC
Genus: Tonatia
 Greater round-eared bat, Tonatia bidens DD
 Stripe-headed round-eared bat, Tonatia saurophila LC
Genus: Trachops
 Fringe-lipped bat, Trachops cirrhosus LC
Genus: Trinycteris
 Niceforo's big-eared bat, Trinycteris nicefori LC
Genus: Vampyrum
 Spectral bat, Vampyrum spectrum NT
Subfamily: Glossophaginae
Genus: Anoura
 Anoura aequatoris
 Cadena's tailless bat, Anoura cadenai
 Tailed tailless bat, Anoura caudifer LC
 Handley's tailless bat, Anoura cultrata NT
 Tube-lipped nectar bat, Anoura fistulata DD
 Geoffroy's tailless bat, Anoura geoffroyi LC
 Broad-toothed tailless bat, Anoura latidens LC
 Luis Manuel's tailless bat, Anoura luismanueli LC
Genus: Choeroniscus
 Godman's long-tailed bat, Choeroniscus godmani LC
 Minor long-nosed long-tongued bat, Choeroniscus minor LC
 Greater long-tailed bat, Choeroniscus periosus VU
Genus: Glossophaga
 Commissaris's long-tongued bat, Glossophaga commissarisi LC
 Miller's long-tongued bat, Glossophaga longirostris DD
 Pallas's long-tongued bat, Glossophaga soricina LC
Genus: Leptonycteris
 Southern long-nosed bat, Leptonycteris curasoae VU
Genus: Lichonycteris
 Dark long-tongued bat, Lichonycteris obscura LC
Genus: Lionycteris
 Chestnut long-tongued bat, Lionycteris spurrelli LC
Genus: Lonchophylla
 Bokermann's nectar bat, Lonchophylla bokermanni DD
 Lonchophylla cadenai
 Chocoan long-tongued bat, Lonchophylla chocoana DD
 Goldman's nectar bat, Lonchophylla concava NT
 Dekeyser's nectar bat, Lonchophylla dekeyseri NT
 Lonchophylla fornicata
 Handley's nectar bat, Lonchophylla handleyi LC
 Western nectar bat, Lonchophylla hesperia VU
 Godman's nectar bat, Lonchophylla mordax LC
 Orcés's long-tongued bat, Lonchophylla orcesi DD
 Lonchophylla pattoni
 Orange nectar bat, Lonchophylla robusta LC
 Thomas's nectar bat, Lonchophylla thomasi LC
Genus: Platalina
 Long-snouted bat, Platalina genovensium NT
Genus: Scleronycteris
 Ega long-tongued bat, Scleronycteris ega LC
Subfamily: Carolliinae
Genus: Carollia
 Benkeith's short-tailed bat, Carollia benkeithi 
 Silky short-tailed bat, Carollia brevicauda LC
 Chestnut short-tailed bat, Carollia castanea LC
 Colombian short-tailed bat, Carollia colombiana
 Manu short-tailed bat, Carollia manu LC
 Mono's short-tailed bat, Carollia monohernandezi
 Seba's short-tailed bat, Carollia perspicillata LC
Genus: Rhinophylla
 Hairy little fruit bat, Rhinophylla alethina NT
 Fischer's little fruit bat, Rhinophylla fischerae LC
 Dwarf little fruit bat, Rhinophylla pumilio LC
Subfamily: Stenodermatinae
Genus: Ametrida
 Little white-shouldered bat, Ametrida centurio LC
Genus: Artibeus
 Large fruit-eating bat, Artibeus amplus LC
 Brown fruit-eating bat, Artibeus concolor LC
 Fringed fruit-eating bat, Artibeus fimbriatus LC
 Fraternal fruit-eating bat, Artibeus fraterculus LC
 Jamaican fruit bat, Artibeus jamaicensis LC
 Great fruit-eating bat, Artibeus lituratus LC
 Dark fruit-eating bat, Artibeus obscurus LC
 Flat-faced fruit-eating bat, Artibeus planirostris LC
Genus: Centurio
 Wrinkle-faced bat, Centurio senex LC
Genus: Chiroderma
 Brazilian big-eyed bat, Chiroderma doriae LC
 Salvin's big-eyed bat, Chiroderma salvini LC
 Little big-eyed bat, Chiroderma trinitatum LC
 Hairy big-eyed bat, Chiroderma villosum LC
Genus: Dermanura
 Andersen's fruit-eating bat, Dermanura anderseni LC
 Bogota fruit-eating bat, Dermanura bogotensis LC
 Gervais's fruit-eating bat, Dermanura cinerea LC
 Silver fruit-eating bat, Dermanura glauca LC
 Gnome fruit-eating bat, Dermanura gnoma LC
 Pygmy fruit-eating bat, Dermanura phaeotis LC
 Dermanura rava NE
 Rosenberg's fruit-eating bat, Dermanura rosenbergi DD
 Toltec fruit-eating bat, Dermanura tolteca LC
 Thomas's fruit-eating bat, Dermanura watsoni LC
Genus: Enchisthenes
 Velvety fruit-eating bat, Enchisthenes hartii LC
Genus: Mesophylla
 MacConnell's bat, Mesophylla macconnelli LC
Genus: Platyrrhinus
 Alberico's broad-nosed bat, Platyrrhinus alberico LC
 Slender broad-nosed bat, Platyrrhinus angustirostris
 Platyrrhinus aquilus
 Eldorado broad-nosed bat, Platyrrhinus aurarius LC
 Short-headed broad-nosed bat, Platyrrhinus brachycephalus LC
 Choco broad-nosed bat, Platyrrhinus chocoensis EN
 Thomas's broad-nosed bat, Platyrrhinus dorsalis LC
 Brown-bellied broad-nosed bat, Platyrrhinus fusciventris
 Heller's broad-nosed bat, Platyrrhinus helleri LC
 Platyrrhinus incarum
 Buffy broad-nosed bat, Platyrrhinus infuscus LC
 Ismael's broad-nosed bat, Platyrrhinus ismaeli VU
 White-lined broad-nosed bat, Platyrrhinus lineatus LC
 Quechua broad-nosed bat, Platyrrhinus masu LC
 Matapalo broad-nosed bat, Platyrrhinus matapalensis NT
 Geoffroy's rayed bat, Platyrrhinus nigellus LC
 Platyrrhinus nitelinea
 Recife broad-nosed bat, Platyrrhinus recifinus LC
 Shadowy broad-nosed bat, Platyrrhinus umbratus DD
 Greater broad-nosed bat, Platyrrhinus vittatus LC
Genus: Sphaeronycteris
 Visored bat, Sphaeronycteris toxophyllum DD
Genus: Pygoderma
 Ipanema bat, Pygoderma bilabiatum LC
Genus: Sturnira
 Aratathomas's yellow-shouldered bat, Sturnira aratathomasi NT
 Bidentate yellow-shouldered bat, Sturnira bidens LC
 Bogota yellow-shouldered bat, Sturnira bogotensis LC
 Hairy yellow-shouldered bat, Sturnira erythromos LC
 Chocó yellow-shouldered bat, Sturnira koopmanhilli 
 Little yellow-shouldered bat, Sturnira lilium LC
 Highland yellow-shouldered bat, Sturnira ludovici LC
 Louis's yellow-shouldered bat, Sturnira luisi LC
 Greater yellow-shouldered bat, Sturnira magna LC
 Mistratoan yellow-shouldered bat, Sturnira mistratensis DD
 Talamancan yellow-shouldered bat, Sturnira mordax NT
 Lesser yellow-shouldered bat, Sturnira nana EN
 Tschudi's yellow-shouldered bat, Sturnira oporaphilum NT
 Soriano's yellow-shouldered bat, Sturnira sorianoi DD
 Tilda's yellow-shouldered bat, Sturnira tildae LC
Genus: Uroderma
 Tent-making bat, Uroderma bilobatum LC
 Brown tent-making bat, Uroderma magnirostrum LC
Genus: Vampyressa
 Bidentate yellow-eared bat, Vampyressa bidens LC
 Brock's yellow-eared bat, Vampyressa brocki LC
 Melissa's yellow-eared bat, Vampyressa melissa VU
 Striped yellow-eared bat, Vampyressa nymphaea LC
 Southern little yellow-eared bat, Vampyressa pusilla DD
 Northern little yellow-eared bat, Vampyressa thyone LC
Genus: Vampyrodes
 Great stripe-faced bat, Vampyrodes caraccioli LC
Subfamily: Desmodontinae
Genus: Desmodus
 Common vampire bat, Desmodus rotundus LC
Genus: Diaemus
 White-winged vampire bat, Diaemus youngi LC
Genus: Diphylla
 Hairy-legged vampire bat, Diphylla ecaudata LC
Family: Natalidae (funnel-eared bats)
Genus: Chilonatalus
 Cuban funnel-eared bat, Chilonatalus micropus NT
Genus: Natalus
 Brazilian funnel-eared bat, Natalus espiritosantensis NT
 Trinidadian funnel-eared bat, Natalus tumidirostris LC
Family: Furipteridae (thumbless bats)
Genus: Amorphochilus
 Smoky bat, Amorphochilus schnablii EN
Genus: Furipterus
 Thumbless bat, Furipterus horrens LC
Family: Thyropteridae (disc-winged bats)
Genus: Thyroptera
 Peters's disk-winged bat, Thyroptera discifera LC
 de Vivo's disk-winged bat, Thyroptera devivoi DD
 LaVal's disk-winged bat, Thyroptera lavali DD
 Spix's disk-winged bat, Thyroptera tricolor LC

Order: Carnivora (carnivorans)

There are over 260 species of carnivorans, the majority of which feed primarily on meat. They have a characteristic skull shape and dentition. South America is notable for its diversity of canids, having more genera than any other continent in spite of their relatively brief history there. South America's felid diversity is also greater than that of North America north of Mexico, while its mustelid diversity is comparable and its mephitid and ursid diversities are lower. Its procyonid diversity is somewhat less than that of Central America, the center of the family's recent evolution. The diversification of canids and felids in South America was partly a consequence of the inability of the continent's native avian and metatherian predators to compete effectively following the Great American Interchange.

Suborder: Feliformia
Family: Felidae (cats)
Subfamily: Felinae
Genus: Herpailurus
 Jaguarundi, Herpailurus yagouaroundi LC
Genus: Puma
 Cougar, Puma concolor LC
Genus: Leopardus
 Pampas cat, Leopardus colocolo NT
 Geoffroy's cat, Leopardus geoffroyi LC
 Kodkod, Leopardus guigna VU
 Southern tigrina, Leopardus guttulus VU
 Andean mountain cat, Leopardus jacobita EN
 Ocelot, Leopardus pardalis LC
 Oncilla, Leopardus tigrinus VU
 Margay, Leopardus wiedii NT
Subfamily: Pantherinae
Genus: Panthera
 Jaguar, Panthera onca NT
Suborder: Caniformia
Family: Canidae (dogs, foxes)
Genus: Dusicyon
 Falkland Island wolf, Dusicyon australis EX
 Dusicyon avus EX
Genus: Lycalopex
 Culpeo, Lycalopex culpaeus LC
 Darwin's fox, Lycalopex fulvipes EN
 South American gray fox, Lycalopex griseus LC
 Pampas fox, Lycalopex gymnocercus LC
 Sechuran fox, Lycalopex sechurae NT
 Hoary fox, Lycalopex vetulus LC
Genus: Cerdocyon
 Crab-eating fox, Cerdocyon thous LC
Genus: Atelocynus
 Short-eared dog, Atelocynus microtis NT
Genus: Speothos
 Bush dog, Speothos venaticus NT
Genus: Chrysocyon
 Maned wolf, Chrysocyon brachyurus NT
Genus: Urocyon
 Gray fox, Urocyon cinereoargenteus LC
Family: Ursidae (bears)
Genus: Tremarctos
 Spectacled bear, Tremarctos ornatus VU
Family: Procyonidae (raccoons, coatis and allies)
Genus: Procyon
 Crab-eating raccoon, Procyon cancrivorus LC
Genus: Nasua
 White-nosed coati, Nasua narica LC
 South American coati, Nasua nasua LC
Genus: Nasuella
 Eastern mountain coati, Nasuella meridensis EN
 Western mountain coati, Nasuella olivacea NT
Genus: Potos
 Kinkajou, Potos flavus LC
Genus: Bassaricyon
 Eastern lowland olingo, Bassaricyon alleni LC
 Western lowland olingo, Bassaricyon medius LC
 Olinguito, Bassaricyon neblina NT
Family: Mustelidae (weasels, otters)
Genus: Neogale
 Amazon weasel, Neogale africana LC
 Colombian weasel, Neogale felipei VU
 Long-tailed weasel, Neogale frenata LC
Genus: Eira
 Tayra, Eira barbara LC
Genus: Galictis
 Lesser grison, Galictis cuja LC
 Greater grison, Galictis vittata LC
Genus: Lyncodon
 Patagonian weasel, Lyncodon patagonicus LC
Genus: Lontra
 Marine otter, Lontra felina EN
 Neotropical river otter, Lontra longicaudis NT
 Southern river otter, Lontra provocax EN
Genus: Pteronura
 Giant otter, Pteronura brasiliensis EN
Family: Mephitidae (skunks)
Genus: Conepatus
 Molina's hog-nosed skunk, Conepatus chinga LC
 Humboldt's hog-nosed skunk, Conepatus humboldtii LC
 Striped hog-nosed skunk, Conepatus semistriatus LC
Clade: Pinnipedia (seals, sea lions and walruses)
Family: Otariidae (eared seals, sea lions)
Genus: Arctocephalus
 South American fur seal, Arctocephalus australis LC
 Galápagos fur seal, Arctocephalus galapagoensis EN
 Antarctic fur seal, Arctocephalus gazella LC
 Juan Fernández fur seal, Arctocephalus philippii LC
 Subantarctic fur seal, Arctocephalus tropicalis LC
Genus: Otaria
 South American sea lion, Otaria flavescens LC
Genus: Zalophus
 Galápagos sea lion, Zalophus wollebaeki EN
Family: Phocidae (earless seals)
Genus: Hydrurga
 Leopard seal, Hydrurga leptonyx LC
Genus: Leptonychotes
 Weddell seal, Leptonychotes weddellii LC
Genus: Lobodon
 Crabeater seal, Lobodon carcinophaga LC
Genus: Mirounga
 Southern elephant seal, Mirounga leonina LC
Genus: Monachus
 Caribbean monk seal, †Monachus tropicalis EX

Order: Perissodactyla (odd-toed ungulates)

The odd-toed ungulates are browsing and grazing mammals. They are usually large to very large, and have relatively simple stomachs and a large middle toe. Following the interchange with North America, South America's odd-toed ungulates included equids of genus Equus as well as tapirs. Equids died out in both North and South America around the time of the first arrival of humans, while tapirs died out in most of North America but survived in Central and South America. South America also once had a great diversity of ungulates of native origin, but these dwindled after the interchange with North America, and disappeared entirely following the arrival of humans. Sequencing of collagen from fossils of one recently extinct species each of notoungulates and litopterns has indicated that these orders comprise a sister group to the perissodactyls. If, as some evidence suggests, perissodactyls originated in India, both ungulate groups may have been of Gondwanan origin, despite being laurasiatheres.

Family: Tapiridae (tapirs)
Genus: Tapirus
 Baird's tapir, Tapirus bairdii EN
 Mountain tapir, Tapirus pinchaque EN
 Lowland tapir, Tapirus terrestris VU

Order: Artiodactyla (even-toed ungulates and cetaceans)

The weight of even-toed ungulates is borne about equally by the third and fourth toes, rather than mostly or entirely by the third as in perissodactyls. There are about 220 noncetacean artiodactyl species, including many that are of great economic importance to humans. South America's considerable cervid diversity belies their relatively recent arrival. The presence of camelids in South America but not North America today is ironic, given that they have a 45-million-year-long history in the latter continent (where they originated), and only a 3-million-year history in the former.

Family: Tayassuidae (peccaries)
Genus: Catagonus
 Chacoan peccary, Catagonus wagneri EN
Genus: Dicotyles
 Collared peccary, Dicotyles tajacu LC
Genus: Tayassu
 White-lipped peccary, Tayassu pecari VU
Family: Camelidae (camels, llamas)
Genus: Lama
 Guanaco, Lama guanicoe LC
 Vicuña, Lama vicugna LC
Family: Cervidae (deer)
Subfamily: Capreolinae
Genus: Blastocerus
 Marsh deer, Blastocerus dichotomus VU
Genus: Hippocamelus
 Taruca, Hippocamelus antisensis VU
 South Andean deer, Hippocamelus bisulcus EN
Genus: Mazama
 Red brocket, Mazama americana DD
 Small red brocket, Mazama bororo VU
 Merida brocket, Mazama bricenii VU
 Dwarf brocket, Mazama chunyi VU
 Gray brocket, Mazama gouazoupira LC
 Pygmy brocket, Mazama nana VU
 Amazonian brown brocket, Mazama nemorivaga LC
 Little red brocket, Mazama rufina VU
 Central American red brocket, Mazama temama DD
Genus: Odocoileus
 White-tailed deer, Odocoileus virginianus LC
Genus: Ozotoceros
 Pampas deer, Ozotoceros bezoarticus NT
Genus: Pudú
 Northern pudú, Pudu mephistophiles VU
 Southern pudú, Pudu puda NT
Subfamily: Cervinae
Genus: Dama
 European fallow deer, D. dama LC introduced

Infraorder: Cetacea (whales, dolphins and porpoises)

The infraorder Cetacea includes whales, dolphins and porpoises. They are the mammals most fully adapted to aquatic life with a spindle-shaped nearly hairless body, protected by a thick layer of blubber, and forelimbs and tail modified to provide propulsion underwater. Their closest extant relatives are the hippos, which are artiodactyls, from which cetaceans descended; cetaceans are thus also artiodactyls.

Parvorder: Mysticeti
Family: Balaenidae (right whales)
Genus: Eubalaena
 Southern right whale, Eubalaena australis LC
Family: Balaenopteridae (rorquals)
Subfamily: Balaenopterinae
Genus: Balaenoptera
 Common minke whale, Balaenoptera acutorostrata LC
 Antarctic minke whale, Balaenoptera bonaerensis NT
 Sei whale, Balaenoptera borealis EN
 Bryde's whale, Balaenoptera brydei NE
 Blue whale, Balaenoptera musculus EN
 Fin whale, Balaenoptera physalus VU
Subfamily: Megapterinae
Genus: Megaptera
 Humpback whale, Megaptera novaeangliae LC
Family: Neobalaenidae
Genus: Caperea
 Pygmy right whale, Caperea marginata LC
Parvorder: Odontoceti
Family: Physeteridae (sperm whales)
Genus: Physeter
 Sperm whale, Physeter macrocephalus VU
Family: Kogiidae (pygmy, dwarf sperm whales)
Genus: Kogia
 Pygmy sperm whale, Kogia breviceps DD
 Dwarf sperm whale, Kogia sima DD
Family: Ziphidae (beaked whales)
Genus: Ziphius
 Cuvier's beaked whale, Ziphius cavirostris LC
Genus: Berardius
 Arnoux's beaked whale, Berardius arnuxii DD
Genus: Tasmacetus
 Shepherd's beaked whale, Tasmacetus shepherdi DD
Subfamily: Hyperoodontinae
Genus: Hyperoodon
 Southern bottlenose whale, Hyperoodon planifrons LC
Genus: Mesoplodon
 Andrews' beaked whale, Mesoplodon bowdoini DD
 Blainville's beaked whale, Mesoplodon densirostris DD
 Gervais' beaked whale, Mesoplodon europaeus DD
 Ginkgo-toothed beaked whale, Mesoplodon ginkgodens DD
 Gray's beaked whale, Mesoplodon grayi DD
 Hector's beaked whale, Mesoplodon hectori DD
 Strap-toothed whale, Mesoplodon layardii DD
 Pygmy beaked whale, Mesoplodon peruvianus DD
 Spade-toothed whale, Mesoplodon traversii DD
Superfamily: Inioidea (river dolphins)
Family: Iniidae
Genus: Inia
 Araguaian river dolphin, Inia araguaiaensis
 Amazon river dolphin, Inia geoffrensis EN
 Bolivian river dolphin, Inia geoffrensis boliviensis
Family: Pontoporiidae
Genus: Pontoporia
 La Plata dolphin, Pontoporia blainvillei VU
Superfamily: Delphinoidea
Family: Phocoenidae (porpoises)
Genus: Phocoena
 Spectacled porpoise, Phocoena dioptrica LC
 Burmeister's porpoise, Phocoena spinipinnis NT
Family: Delphinidae (marine dolphins)
Genus: Cephalorhynchus
 Commerson's dolphin, Cephalorhynchus commersonii LC
 Chilean dolphin, Cephalorhynchus eutropia NT
Genus: Steno
 Rough-toothed dolphin, Steno bredanensis LC
Genus: Sotalia
 Tucuxi, Sotalia fluviatilis DD
 Guiana dolphin, Sotalia guianensis NT
Genus: Tursiops
 Common bottlenose dolphin, Tursiops truncatus LC
Genus: Stenella
 Pantropical spotted dolphin, Stenella attenuata LC
 Clymene dolphin, Stenella clymene LC
 Striped dolphin, Stenella coeruleoalba LC
 Atlantic spotted dolphin, Stenella frontalis LC
 Spinner dolphin, Stenella longirostris LC
Genus: Delphinus
 Long-beaked common dolphin, Delphinus capensis DD
 Short-beaked common dolphin, Delphinus delphis LC
Genus: Lagenodelphis
 Fraser's dolphin, Lagenodelphis hosei LC
Genus: Lagenorhynchus
 Peale's dolphin, Lagenorhynchus australis DD
 Hourglass dolphin, Lagenorhynchus cruciger LC
 Dusky dolphin, Lagenorhynchus obscurus DD
Genus: Lissodelphis
 Southern right whale dolphin, Lissodelphis peronii LC
Genus: Grampus
 Risso's dolphin, Grampus griseus LC
Genus: Feresa
 Pygmy killer whale, Feresa attenuata LC
Genus: Orcinus
 Orca, Orcinus orca DD
Genus: Pseudorca
 False killer whale, Pseudorca crassidens NT
Genus: Globicephala
 Short-finned pilot whale, Globicephala macrorhynchus LC
 Long-finned pilot whale, Globicephala melas LC
Genus: Peponocephala
 Melon-headed whale, Peponocephala electra LC

See also
Invasive species in South America
List of chordate orders
Lists of mammals by region
List of prehistoric mammals
Mammal classification
List of mammals described in the 2000s

Notes

References

 

 (Google books link)

Lists of Western Hemisphere mammals from north to south

 South America
'
South America
Mammals